= Tatars =

Turkic ethnic groups in Eurasia

татары татарлар tatarlar تاتارلار
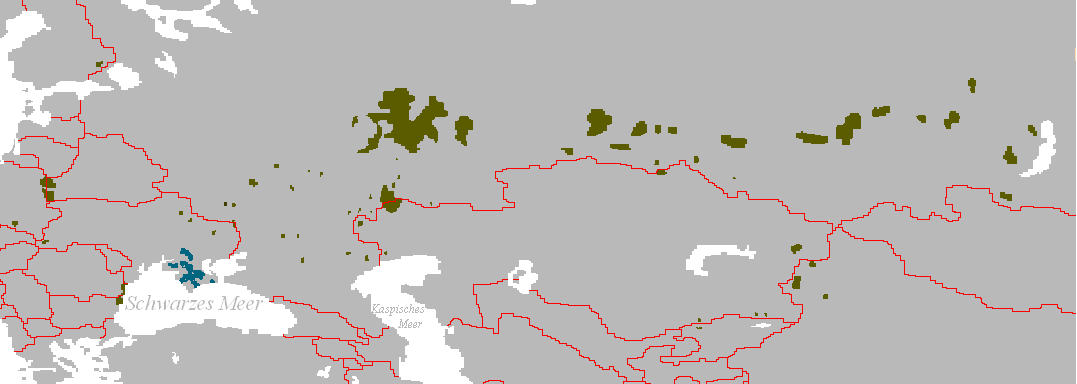

Total population
- Volga Tatars: 6.6–7.0 million; Crimean Tatars: ≈500,000 – 6.7 million; Afghan Tatars: c. 100,000; Siberian Tatars: c. 100,000–200,000; Lipka Tatars: c. 10,000–15,000

Regions with significant populations
- Russia: 5,554,601
- Turkey: 4–6 million (Note: In Turkey, the census does not indicate the nationality, because all residents of Turkey are considered Turks, so it is impossible to name at least the approximate number of Turkish citizens, considering themselves as Crimean Tatars.)
- Ukraine: (incl. population in Crimea and Crimean Tatars): 319,377
- Uzbekistan: ≈239,965 (Crimean Tatars)
- Kazakhstan: 208,987
- Afghanistan: 100,000 (estimate)
- Canada: 56,000 (incl. those of mixed ancestries)
- Turkmenistan: 36,655
- Kyrgyzstan: 28,334
- Azerbaijan: 25,900
- Iran: 20,000–30,000 (Volga Tatars)
- Romania: ≈20,000
- United States: 10,000
- Bulgaria: 5,003
- China: 3,544
- Belarus: 3,000
- Lithuania: 2,800–3,200 (incl. all of Lipka, Crimean and Volga origins)
- Latvia: 2,800
- Estonia: 2,000
- Poland: 1,916
- Japan: 600–2000
- Switzerland: 1,045+
- France: 700
- Finland: 600–700
- Australia: 500+
- Czech Republic: 300+

Languages
- Kipchak languages

Religion
- Predominantly Sunni Islam with Eastern Orthodox minority

Related ethnic groups
- Other Turkic peoples, especially other speakers of Kipchak languages

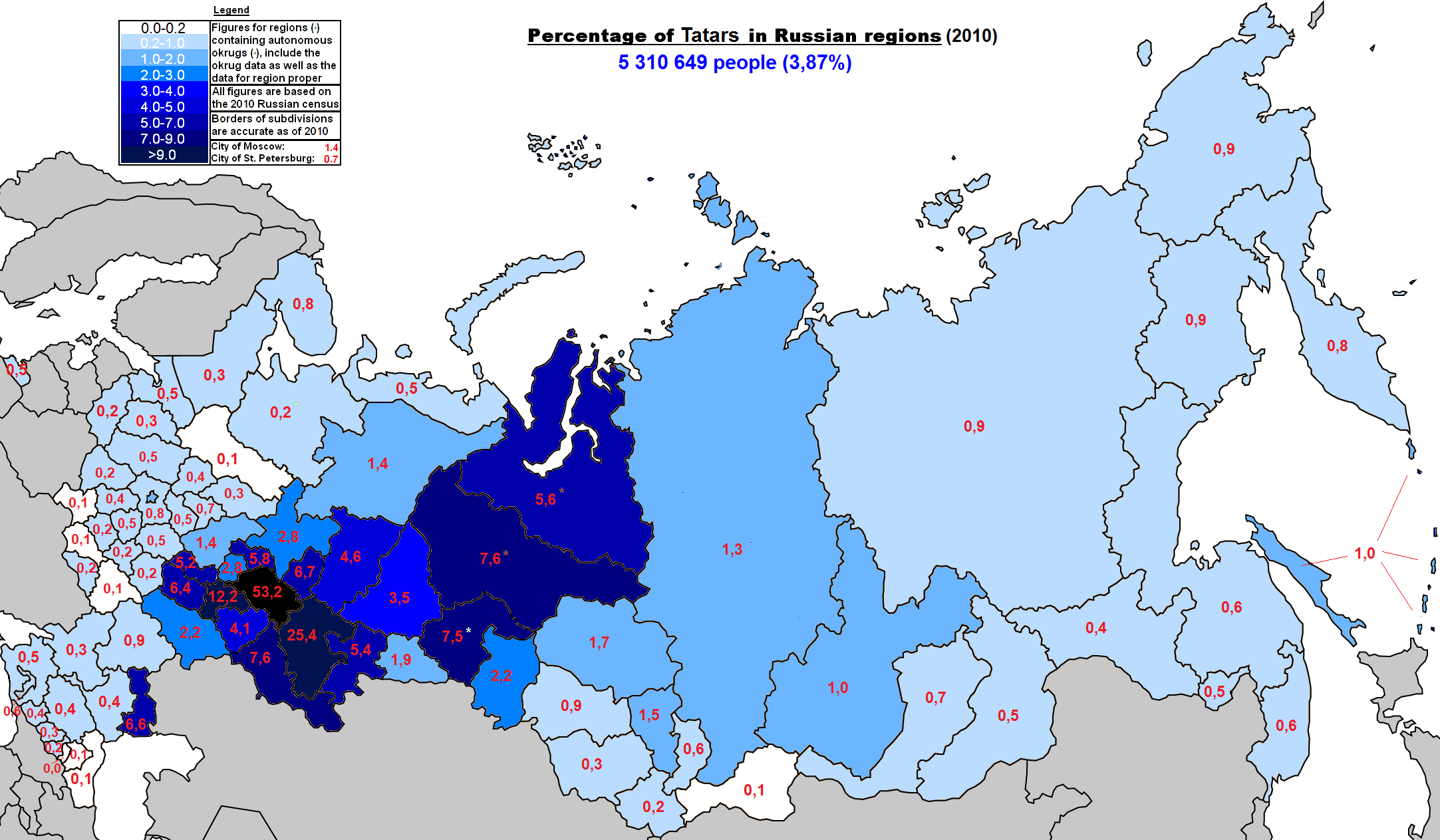
Share of Tatars in regions of Russia, 2010 census

The Tatars (Note: Often spelled Tartar in English to specify the pronunciation /ˈtɑː.-/ and prevent misinterpretation as /teɪ.-/. Tatar: татарлар, romanized: tatarlar, تاتارلر; Crimean Tatar: tatarlar; Old Turkic: 𐱃𐱃𐰺, romanized: tatar)) (/ˈtɑː.tərz/, TAH-tərz) are a group of Turkic speaking peoples found across Eastern Europe and Northern Asia who bear the name "Tatar".

Initially, the ethnonym Tatar possibly referred to the Tatar confederation. That confederation was eventually incorporated into the Mongol Empire when Genghis Khan unified the various steppe tribes. Historically, the term Tatar (or Tartar) was applied by western cartographers to anyone from the vast Northern and Central Asian landmass then known as Tartary, a term that was falsely conflated with the Mongol Empire. More recently, the term has come to refer more narrowly to related ethnic groups who call themselves Tatars.

By far the largest group amongst the Tatars are the Volga Tatars, native to the Volga-Ural region (Tatarstan and Bashkortostan) of European Russia, who for this reason are often also known as Tatars in Russian. They compose 53% of Tatarstan's population. Their language is known as the Tatar language. As of 2010, there were an estimated 5.3 million ethnic Tatars in Russia.

While also speaking languages belonging to different Kipchak sub-groups, genetic studies have shown that the three main groups of Tatars (Volga, Crimean, and Siberian) are apparently unrelated, and thus their formation occurred independently of one another, but it is possible that at least one of the Tatar groups had cultural influence mainly from the times of the Golden Horde.

Many noble families in the Tsardom of Russia and Russian Empire had Tatar origins.

== Etymology ==
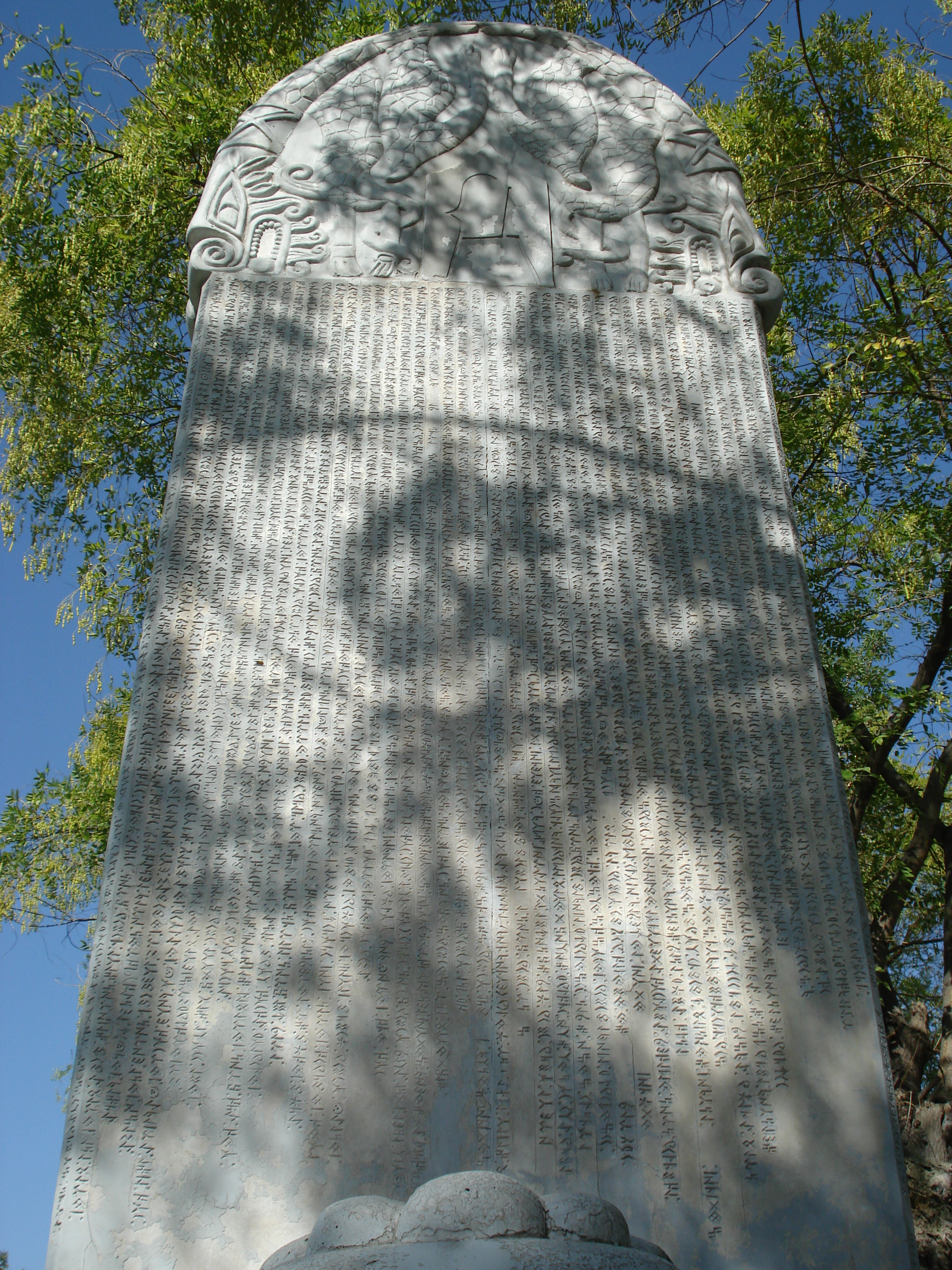
Orkhon inscriptions in Old Turkic (replica)

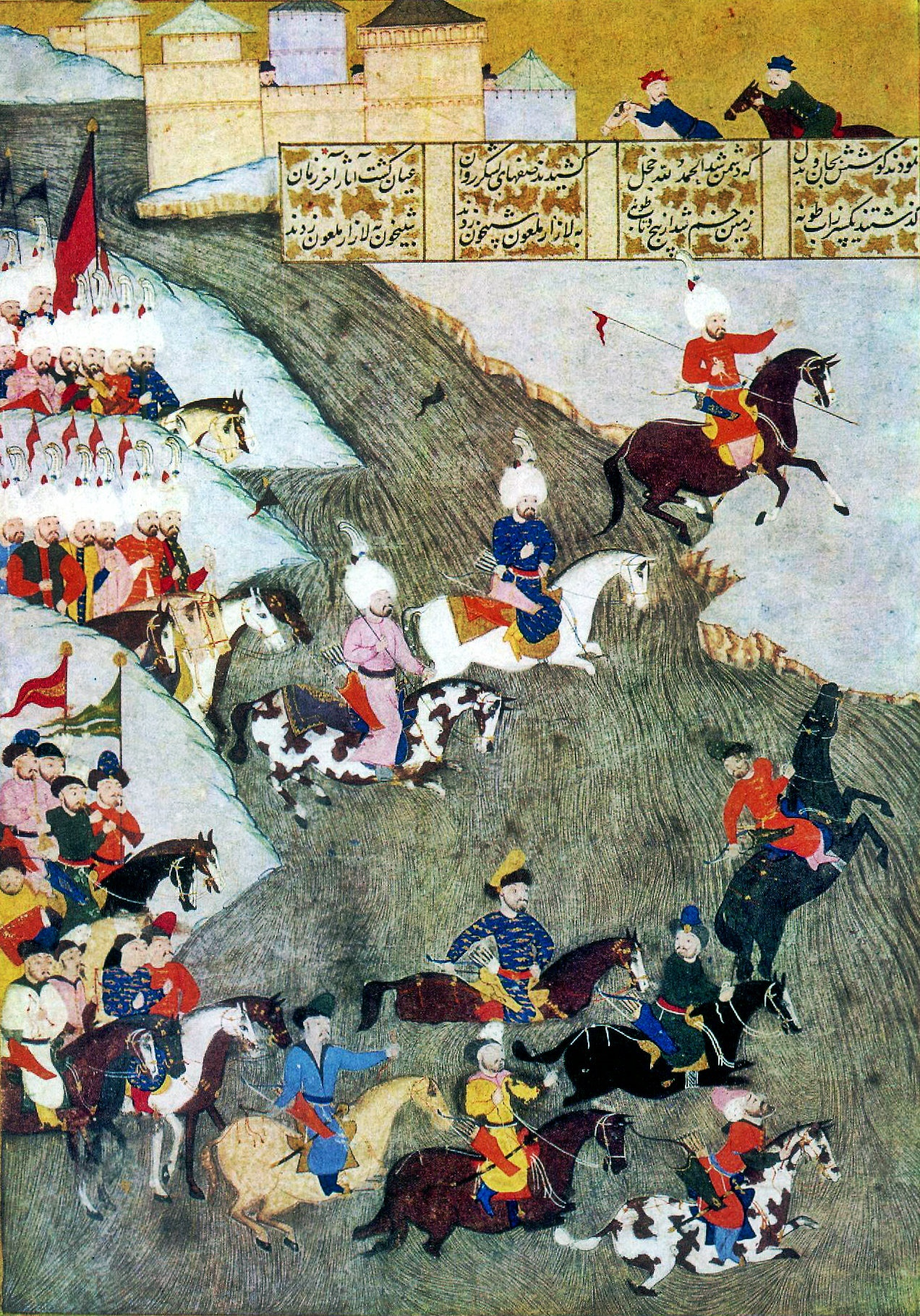
Ottoman miniature of the 1566 Szigetvár campaign showing Ottoman troops and Crimean Tatars as vanguard

Tatar became a name for populations of the former Golden Horde in Europe, such as those of the former Kazan, Crimean, Astrakhan, Qasim, and Siberian Khanates. The form Tartar has its origins in either Latin or French, coming to Western European languages from Turkish and the Persian (tātār, "mounted messenger"). From the beginning, the extra r was present in the Western forms and according to the Oxford English Dictionary this was most likely due to an association with Tartarus. (Note: citing a letter to St Louis of Frances dated 1270 which makes the connection explicit, "In the present danger of the Tartars either we shall push them back into the Tartarus whence they are come, or they will bring us all into heaven.")

The Persian word is first recorded in the 13th century in reference to the hordes of Genghis Khan and is of unknown origin; according to the Oxford English Dictionary it is "said to be" ultimately from tata. The Arabic word for Tatars is تتار. Tatars themselves wrote their name as تاتار or طاطار.

Tatar was also an endonym to a number of peoples of Siberia and Russian Far East, namely Chulyms (татар, tatar), also Khakas, Teleut, and Shor (тадар, tadar). Ochir (2016) states that Siberian Tatars and the Tatars living in the territories between Asia and Europe are of Turkic origin, acquired the appellation Tatar later, and do not possess ancestral connection to the Mongolic Nine Tatars, whose ethnogenesis involved Mongolic people as well as Mongolized Turks who had been ruling over them during the 6–8th centuries. Valikhova et al. (2022) states that Siberian Tatars, at least Tom Tatars, have Mongol genetic component, which is in line with their genetic history.

Pow (2019) proposes that Turkic-speaking peoples of Cumania (i.e. Polovtsians), as a sign of political allegiance, adopted the endonym Tatar of their Mongol conquerors, before ultimately subsuming the latter culturally and linguistically in the Golden Horde; therefore, the term Tatar was originally not just an exonym.

Some Turkic peoples living within the Russian Empire were named Tatar, although not all Turkic peoples of Russian Empire were referred to as Tatars (for instance, this name was never used in relation to the Yakuts, Chuvashes, Sarts and some others). Some of these populations used and keep using Tatar as a self-designation, others do not.

- Oghur branch
  - Chuvash: Chuvash Tatars
- Kipchak groups
  - Kipchak–Bulgar branch or "Tatar" in the narrow sense
    - Volga Tatars
      - Astrakhan Tatars
    - Lipka Tatars
  - Kipchak–Cuman branch
    - Crimean Tatars
    - Karachays and Balkars: Mountain Tatars
    - Kumyks: Daghestan Tatars
  - Kipchak–Nogai branch:
    - Dobrujan Tatars
    - Nogais: Nogai Tatars
    - Tobol-Irtysh group of Siberian Tatars
  - Kipchak-Kyrgyz branch
    - Baraba group of Siberian Tatars
    - Tom group of Siberian Tatars
    - Southern Altaians (Altai-Kizhi)
- Siberian branch:
  - Northern Altaians: Altai Tatars, including the Tubalar or Chernevo Tatars (Note: The name originating from the name of spruce–fir Taiga forests in Russian language: черневая тайга)
  - Chulyms or Chulym Tatars
  - Khakas: Yenisei Tatars (also Abakan Tatars or Achin Tatars), still use the Tatar designation
  - Shors: Kuznetsk Tatars
- Oghuz branch
  - Azerbaijanis: Caucasus Tatars (also Transcaucasia Tatars or Azerbaijan Tatars)
  - Turkmen Tatars

== Languages ==
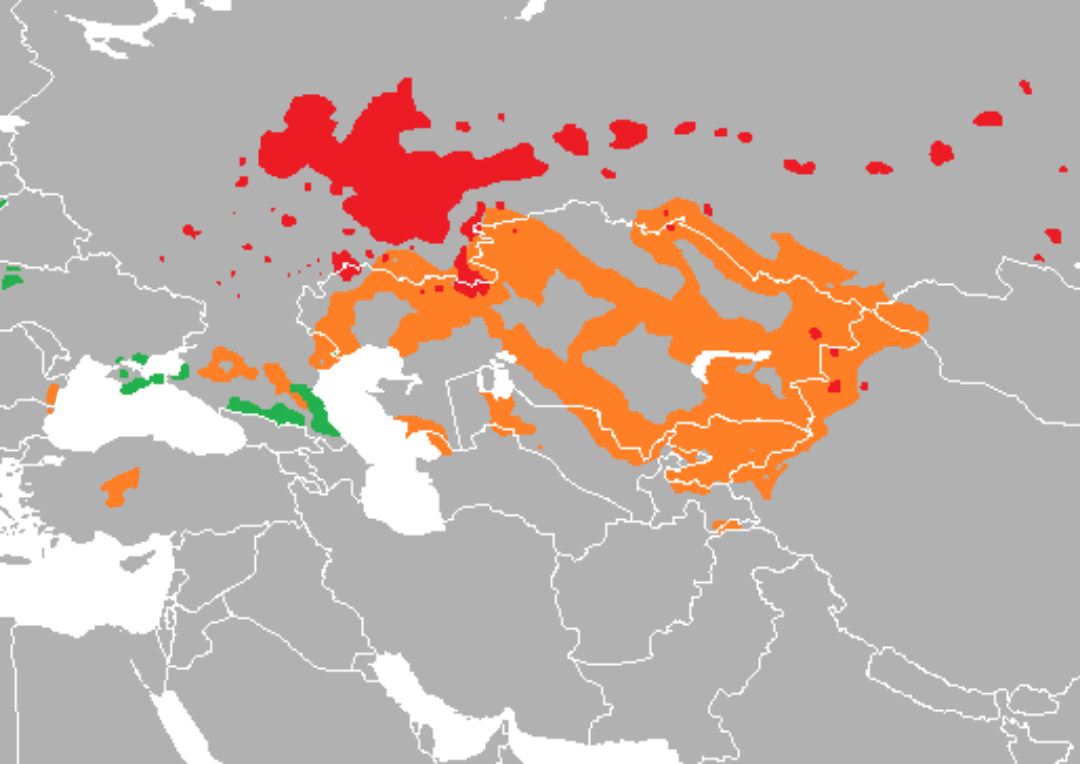
Contemporary distribution of Kipchak languages: Kipchak–Volga-Ural Kipchak–Cuman Kipchak–Nogay and Kyrgyz–Kipchak

Eleventh-century Kara-khanid scholar Mahmud al-Kashgari noted that the historical Tatars were bilingual, speaking other Turkic languages besides their own.

The modern Tatar language, together with the Bashkir language, forms the Kypchak-Volga-Ural group within the Kipchak languages (also known as Northwestern Turkic).

There are two Tatar dialects—Central and Western. The Western dialect (Misher) is spoken mostly by Mishärs, the Central dialect is spoken by Kazan and Astrakhan Tatars. Both dialects have subdialects. Central Tatar furnishes the base of literary Tatar.

The Siberian Tatar language is independent of Volga–Ural Tatar. The dialects are quite remote from Standard Tatar and from each other, often preventing mutual comprehension. The claim that Siberian Tatar is part of the modern Tatar language is typically supported by linguists in Kazan and denounced by Siberian Tatars.

Crimean Tatar (Note: also rarely called Crimean language or even more rarely Crimean Turkic) is the indigenous language of the Crimean Tatar people. Because of its common name, Crimean Tatar is sometimes mistakenly seen in Russia as a dialect of Kazan Tatar. Although these languages are related (as both are Turkic), the Kypchak languages closest to Crimean Tatar are (as mentioned above) Kumyk and Karachay-Balkar, not Kazan Tatar. Still, there exists an opinion (E. R. Tenishev), according to which the Kazan Tatar language is included in the same Kipchak-Cuman group as Crimean Tatar.

== Contemporary groups and nations ==
The largest Tatar populations are the Volga Tatars, native to the Idel-Ural (Volga-Ural) region of European Russia, and the Crimean Tatars of Crimea. Smaller groups of Lipka Tatars and Astrakhan Tatars also live in Europe and the Siberian Tatars in Asia.

=== Volga Tatars ===
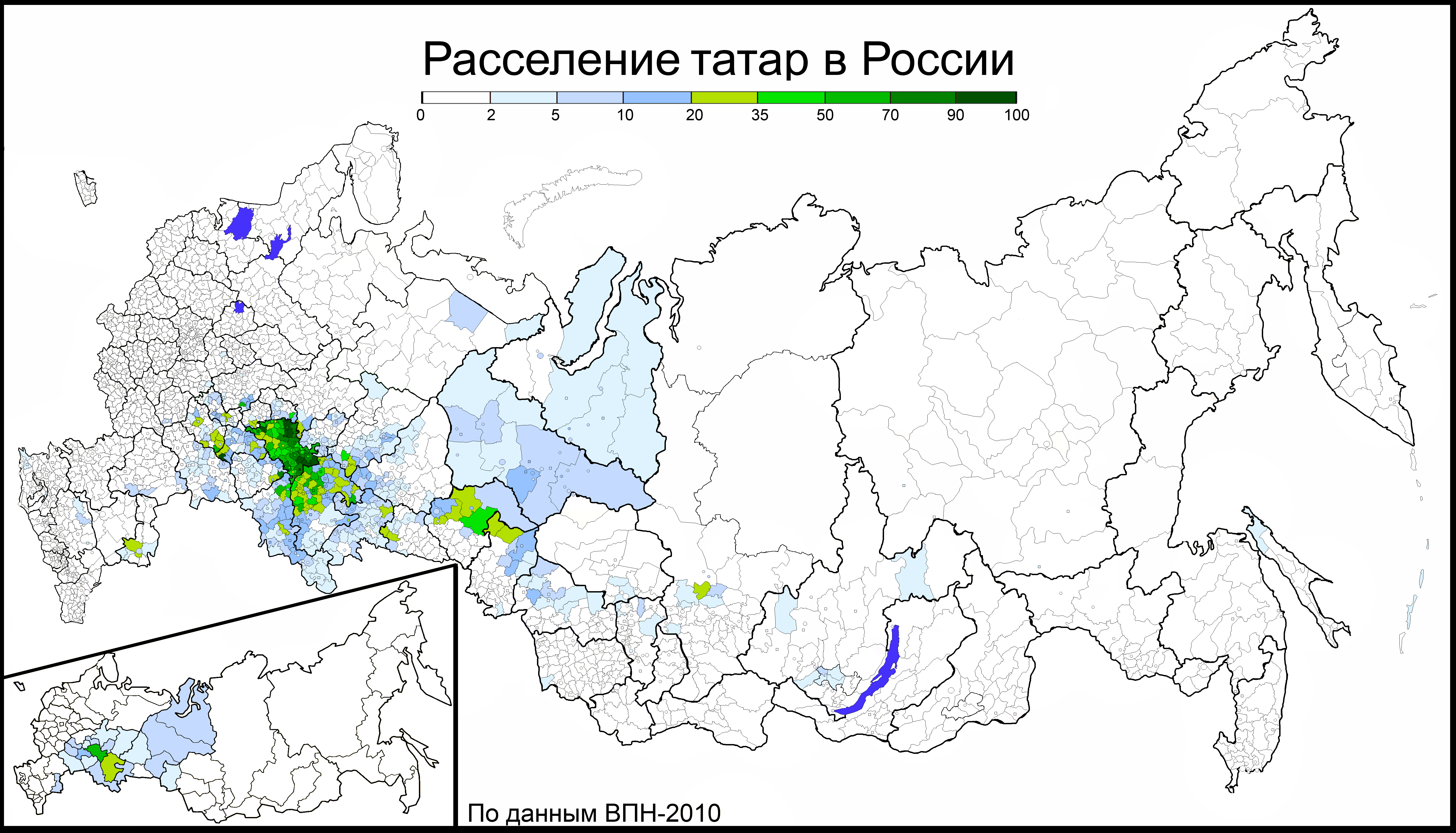
The areas of settlement of Tatars in Russia according to the National Population Census 2010

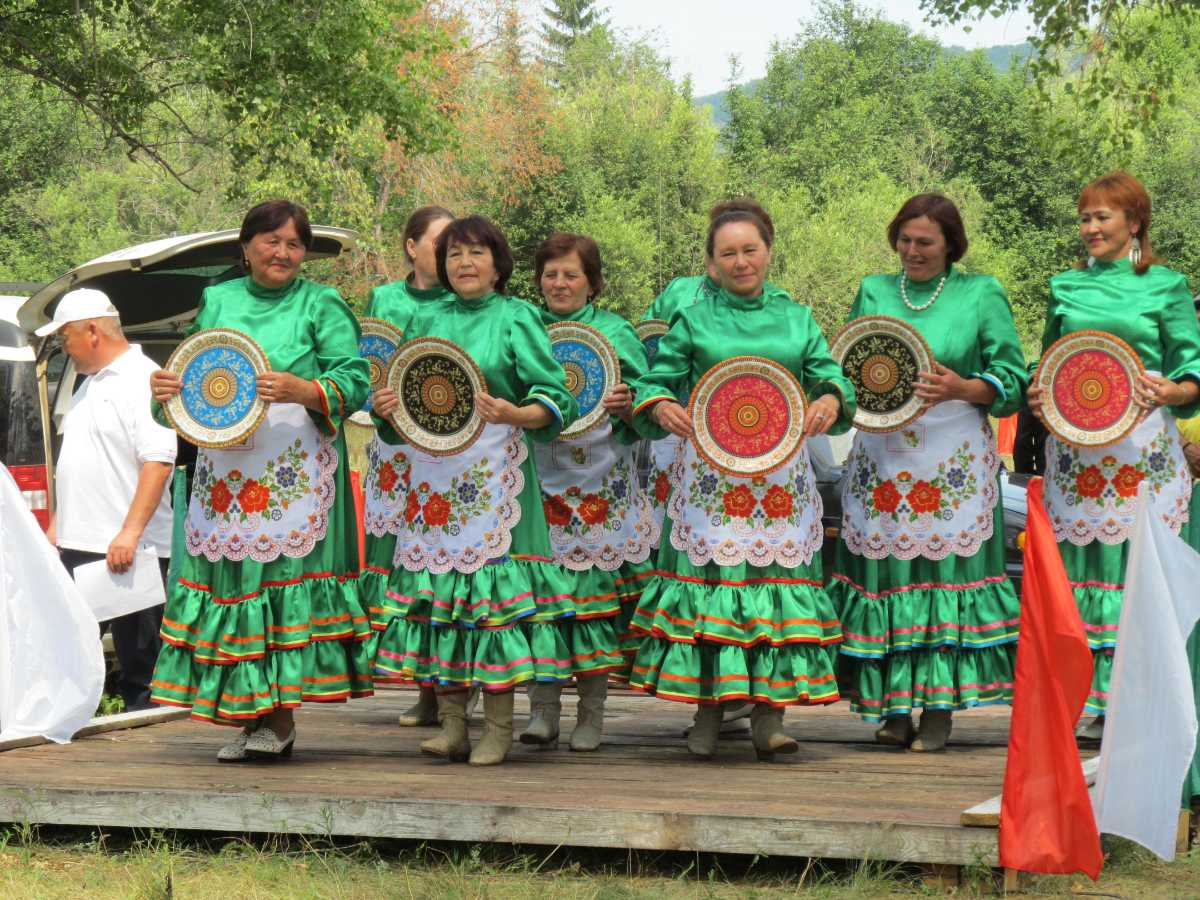
Volga Tatars in traditional clothing

In the 7th century AD, the Volga Bulgars settled on the territory of the Volga-Kama region, where Finno-Ugrians lived compactly at that time. Bulgars inhabited part of the modern territory of Tatarstan, Udmurtia, Ulyanovsk region, Samara region and Chuvashia. After the invasion of Batu Khan in 1223–1236, the Golden Horde destroyed Volga Bulgaria. Most of the population of the Bulgars survived and crossed to the right bank of the Volga, displacing the Mountain Mari (cheremis) from the inhabited territories to the meadow side. In the year 1236, according to a Russian annalist: "there came from the countries of the East into the Bulgar lands the godless Tatars and sacked the good city of Bolgar and killed everyone from the old to the young and the tiniest suckling". It is likely the first time that the name Tatar was used in connection with the region.

After a while, Tatars from all the outskirts of the Golden Horde began to arrive in the Kazan Khanate, and consisted mainly of Kipchak peoples: Nogais and Crimean Tatars.

Kazan was built by the Perekop fugitives from Taurida during the reign of Vasily Vasilyevich in Moscow. Vasily Ivanovich forced her to take tsars from him for herself. And then, when she was indignant, he embarrassed her with the hardships of a dangerous war, but he did not conquer her. But in 7061 (1552), his son Ivan IV took the city of Kazan after a six-month siege together with the Cheremis. However, in the form of a reward for the offense, he subdued neighboring Bulgaria, which he could not stand for frequent rebellions. — The journey to Muscovy of Baron Augustine Mayerberg and Horace Wilhelm Calvucci, ambassadors of the August Roman Emperor Leopold to the Tsar and Grand Duke Alexei Mikhailovich in 1661, described by Baron Mayerberg himself

Kazan Tatars are descendants of the Tatars of the Kazan Kingdom of the Kipchak Horde. — "Alphabetical list of peoples living in the Russian Empire in 1895"

Kazan Tatars got their name from the main city of Kazan—and it is so called from the Tatar word Kazan, the cauldron, which was omitted by the servant of the founder of this city, Khan Altyn Bek, not on purpose, when he scooped water for his master to wash, in the river now called Kazanka. In other respects, according to their own legends, they were not of a special tribe, but descended from the fighters who remained here [in Kazan] on the settlement of different generations and from foreigners attracted to Kazan, but especially Nogai Tatars, who all through their union into a single society formed a special people.

— Carl Wilhelm Müller. "Description of all the peoples living in the Russian state,.." Part Two. About the peoples of the Tatar tribe. S-P, 1776, Translated from German.

— Johann Gottlieb Georgi. Description of all the peoples living in the Russian state : their everyday rituals, customs, clothes, dwellings, exercises, amusements, faiths and other memorabilia. Part 2 : About the peoples of the Tatar tribe and other undecided origin of the Northern Siberian. — 1799. page 8

Also in Kazan there is a famous "Kaban Lake" similar to the name of the "Kuban River", which translates from Nogai as "overflowing".

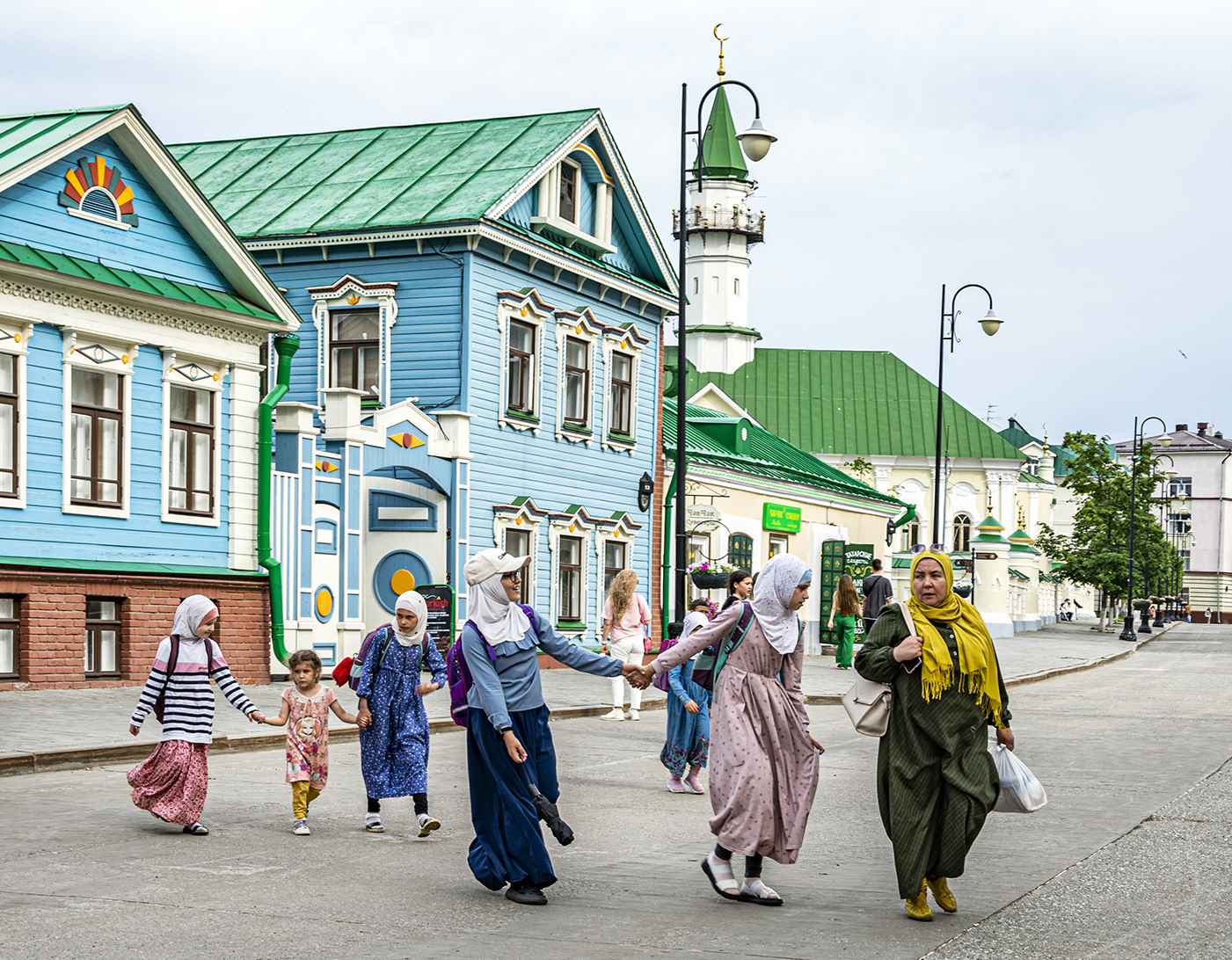
Tatar women in Kazan, Tatarstan

The main now central Bauman Street that leads to the Kremlin is one of the oldest streets in Kazan. In the era of the Kazan Khanate, it was called the Nogai district. Nogai daruga is a conditional territory, the possessions of which are controlled by the Nogai Horde, they were run by foremen beki:

- Alibai Murzagulov, in 1773 the foreman of the Nogaiskaya daruga (administrative territory – district)
- Kinzya Arslanov foreman of the Bushmas-Kipchak parish of the Nogaiskaya daruga (administrative territory)
- Yamansary Yapparov foreman of the Suun-Kypsak parish of the Nogaiskaya daruga (administrative territory)

The Tatar Queen Syuyumbike, who was the daughter of the Nogai biya, also testifies to the Nogai roots of the Kazan Tatars. And this is also confirmed by the Khans of the Kazan Khanate:

- Ulu-Muhammad Khan, son of Ichkile Hasan-oglan (1438–1445), former khan of the Golden Horde.
- Mamuk (Tyumen tatar) Khan (1496–1497).
- Shah-Ali Khan, son of Kasimov tatar Sheikh-Auliyar Sultan (1519–1521, 1546, 1551–1552).
- Sahib-Giray Khan, son of Crimean tatar Khan Mengli Giray (1521–1524, 1524–1531, 1536–1546, 1546–1549).
- Utyamysh-Giray Nogai tatar Khan, son of Safa-Giray Khan (1549–1551).
- Yadygar-Muhammad Khan, son of Kasimov tatar Khan of Astrakhan (1552).
- Ali-Akram Khan (Nogai dynasty) (1553–1556).

The large coat of arms of Tsar Ivan IV the Terrible testifies that the Tatars of the Kazan Khanate and the Bulgars of the Volga Bulgarian land are different peoples and territories with different coats of arms.

Forming

The majority of Volga Tatars (Kazan Tatars and Mishars) are usually thought to be descendants of either the Kipchaks (Polovtsians) of Golden Horde, or Bulgars, that survived the Mongol conquest of 1236–1237. There were only minor groups of Kipchak tribes on the Bulgarian and Cheremis land, and there were very few of them on the territory of the future Kazan Khanate. But during the events of 1438–1445, associated with the formation of the Kazan Khanate, together with Khan Uluk-Muhammad, about 40 thousand Tatars arrived here at once. Subsequently, Tatars from Astrakhan, Azov, Crimea, Akhtubinsk and other places moved to the Kazan Khanate. The Arab historian Al-Omari (Shihabuddin al-Umari) wrote that, having joined the Golden Horde, the Cumans moved to the position of subjects. The Tatar-Mongols settled on the territory of the Polovtsian steppe and gradually mixed with the Polovtsians. Al-Omari concludes that after several generations, the Tatars began to look like Polovtsy: "as if from the same (with them) kind," because they began to live on their lands.

Finally in the end of the 19th century; although the name Nogailars persisted in some places; the majority identified themselves simply as the Muslims) and the language of the Kipchaks; on the other hand, the invaders eventually converted to Sunni Islam (c. 14th century). As the Golden Horde disintegrated in the 15th century, the area became the territory of the Kazan khanate, which Russia ultimately conquered in the 16th century.

Some Volga Tatars speak different dialects of the Tatar language. Accordingly, they form distinct groups such as the Mişär group and the Qasim group:

- Mişär-Tatars (or Mishars) are a group of Tatars speaking a Mishar dialect of the Tatar language. They live in the Chelyabinsk, Tambov, Penza, Ryazan and Nizhegorodskaya oblasts of Russia and in Bashkortostan and Mordovia. They live on the right bank of the Volga River, in Tatarstan.
- The Western Tatars have their capital in the town of Qasím (Kasimov, Russian: Касимов) in Ryazan Oblast, with a Tatar population of 1100.

Tatar khanates that emerged from the Golden Horde in the 15th century

A minority of Christianized Volga Tatars are known as Keräşens.

The Volga Tatars used the Turkic Old Tatar language for their literature between the 15th and 19th centuries. It was written in the İske imlâ variant of the Arabic script, but actual spelling varied regionally. The older literary language included many Arabic and Persian loanwords. However, the modern literary language (generally written using a Cyrillic alphabet), often has Russian- and other European-derived words instead.

Outside of Tatarstan, urban Tatars usually speak Russian as their first language (in cities such as Moscow, Saint Petersburg, Nizhniy Novgorod, Tashkent, Almaty, and in cities of the Ural region and western Siberia) and other languages in a worldwide diaspora.

In the 1910s the Volga Tatars numbered about half a million in the Kazan Governorate in Tatarstan, their historical homeland, about 400,000 in each of the governments of Ufa, 100,000 in Samara and Simbirsk, and about 30,000 in Vyatka, Saratov, Tambov, Penza, Nizhny Novgorod, Perm and Orenburg. An additional 15,000 had migrated to Ryazan or were settled as prisoners in the 16th and 17th centuries in Lithuania (Vilnius, Grodno and Podolia). An additional 2,000 resided in St. Petersburg.

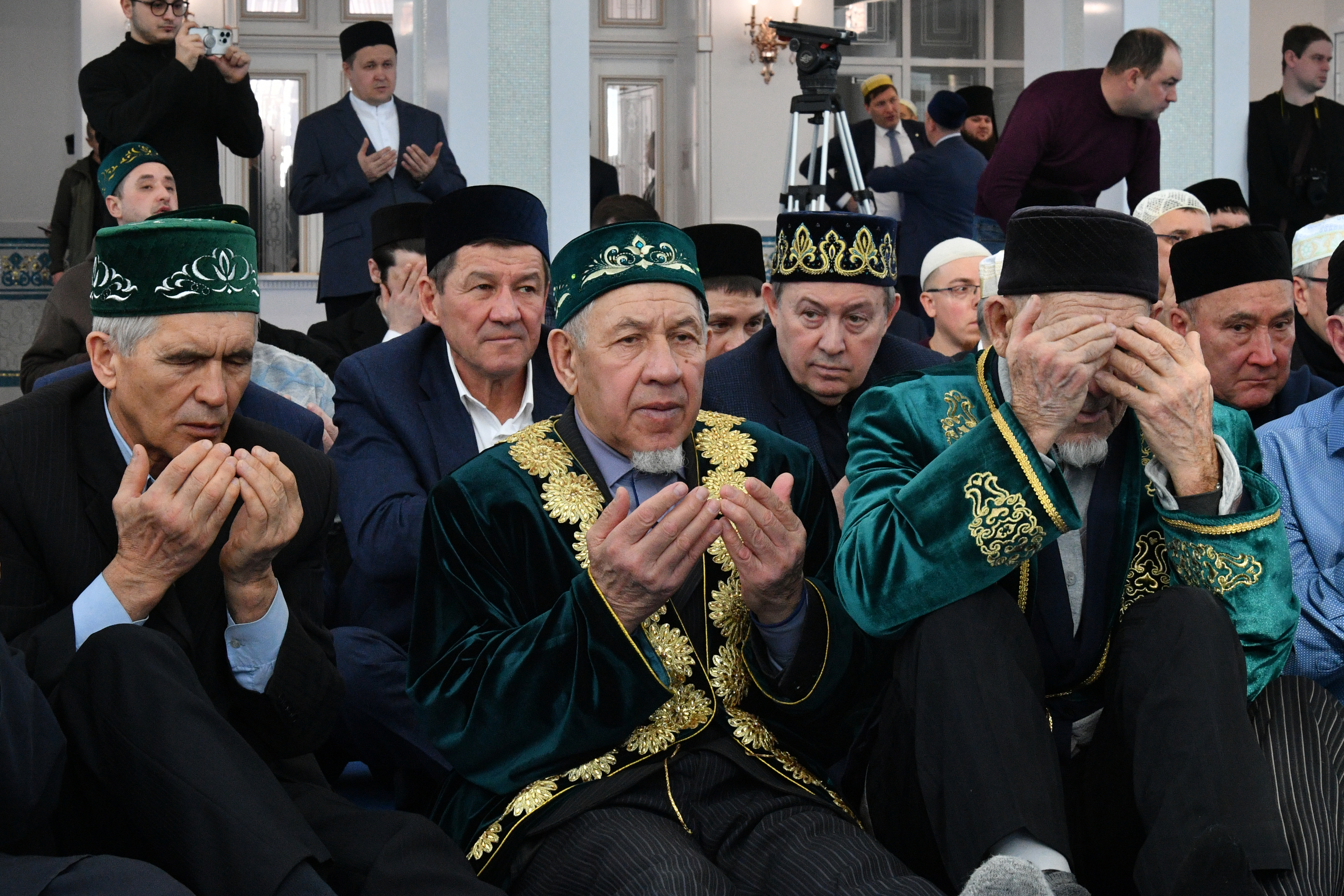
Volga Tatars praying in a mosque in Bolgar, Tatarstan

Most Kazan Tatars practice Islam. The Kazan Tatars speak Kazan (normal) Tatar language, with a substantial amount of Russian and Arabic loanwords.

Before 1917, polygamy was practiced only by the wealthier classes and was a waning institution.

==== Astrakhan Tatars ====
The Astrakhan Tatars (around 80,000) are a group of Tatars, descendants of the Astrakhan Khanate's population, who live mostly in Astrakhan Oblast. In the Russian census of 2010 most Astrakhan Tatars declared themselves simply as "Tatars" and few declared themselves as "Astrakhan Tatars". Many Volga Tatars live in Astrakhan Oblast, and differences between the two groups have been disappearing.

=== Lipka Tatars ===
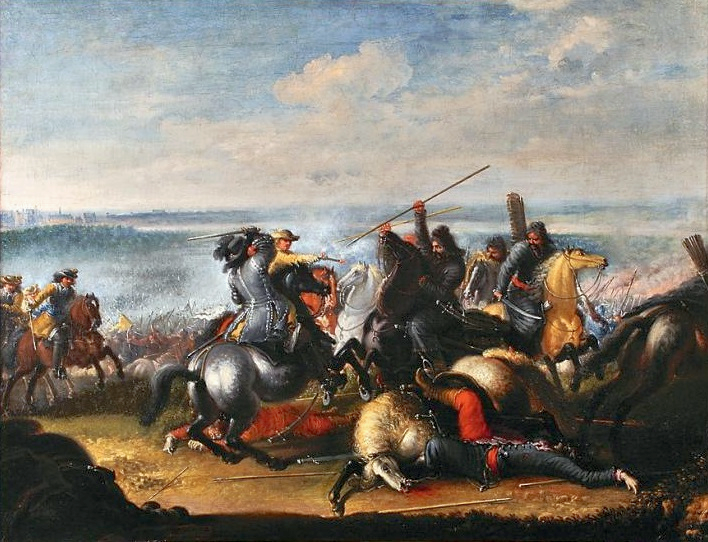
Swedish King Charles X Gustav in a skirmish with Tatars near Warsaw during the Second Northern War of 1655–1660

The Lipka Tatars are a group of Turkic-speaking Tatars who originally settled in the Grand Duchy of Lithuania at the beginning of the 14th century. The first settlers tried to preserve their shamanistic religion and sought asylum amongst the non-Christian Lithuanians. Towards the end of the 14th century Grand Duke Vytautas the Great of Lithuania (ruled 1392–1430) invited another wave of Tatars—Muslims, this time—into the Grand Duchy. These Tatars first settled in Lithuania proper around Vilnius, Trakai, Hrodna and Kaunas and spread to other parts of the Grand Duchy that later became part of the Polish–Lithuanian Commonwealth in 1569. These areas comprise parts of present-day Lithuania, Belarus and Poland. From the very beginning of their settlement in Lithuania they were known as the Lipka Tatars.

From the 13th to 17th centuries various groups of Tatars settled and/or found refuge within the Polish–Lithuanian Commonwealth. The Grand Dukes of Lithuania especially promoted the migrations because of the Tatars' reputation as skilled warriors. The Tatar settlers were all granted szlachta (nobility) status, a tradition that survived until the end of the Commonwealth in the late 18th century. Such migrants included the Lipka Tatars (13th–14th centuries) as well as Crimean and Nogay Tatars (15th–16th centuries), all of which were notable in Polish military history, as well as Volga Tatars (16th–17th centuries). They all mostly settled in the Grand Duchy of Lithuania.

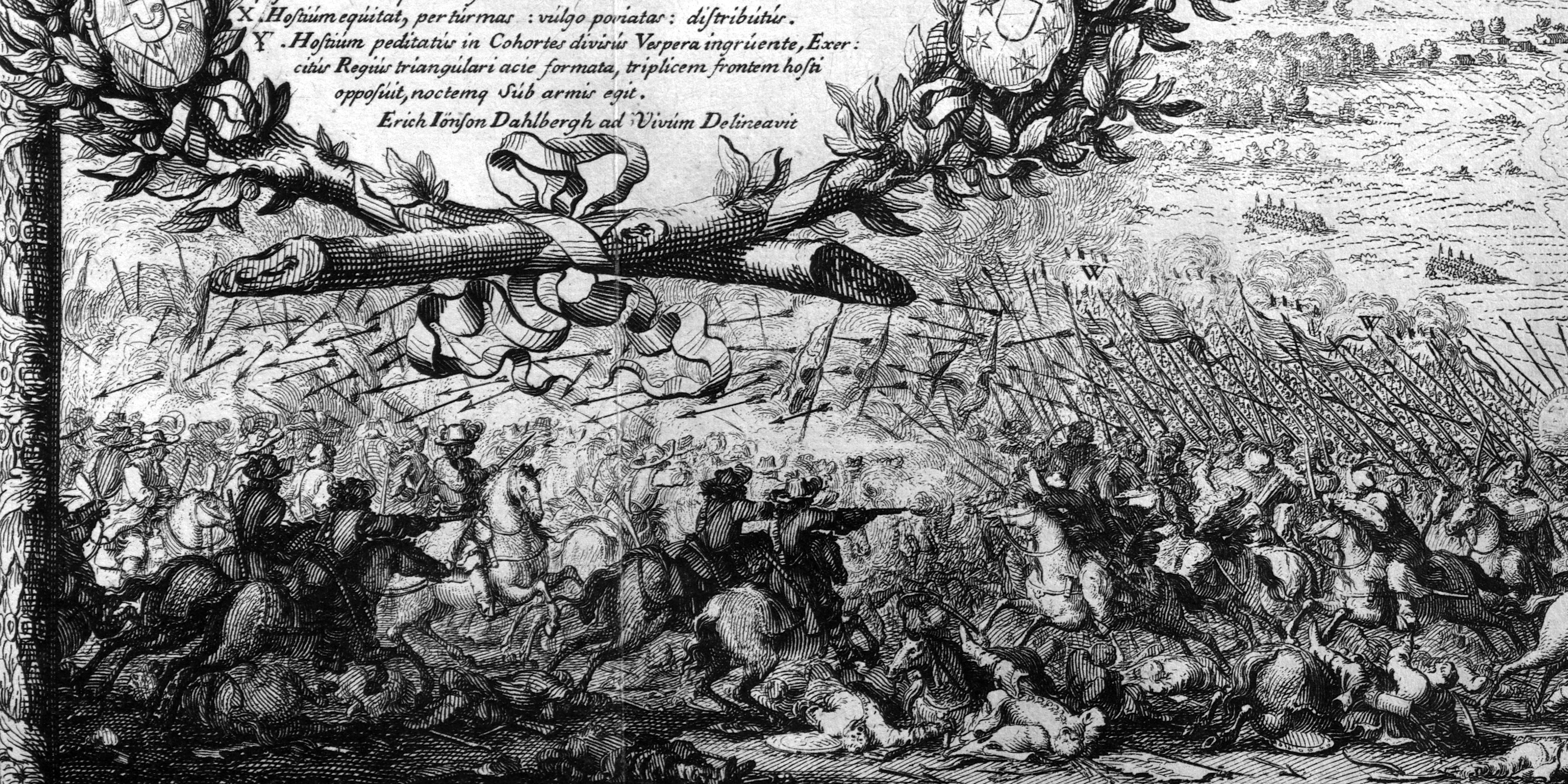
At the Battle of Warsaw in 1656 Tatars fought with the Poles against the Swedes.

Various estimates of the Tatars in the Commonwealth in the 17th century place their numbers at about 15,000 persons and 60 villages with mosques. Numerous royal privileges, as well as internal autonomy granted by the monarchs, allowed the Tatars to preserve their religion, traditions, and culture over the centuries. The Tatars were allowed to intermarry with Christians, a practice uncommon in Europe at the time. The May Constitution of 1791 gave the Tatars representation in the Polish Sejm (parliament).

Although by the 18th century the Tatars had adopted the local language, the Islamic religion and many Tatar traditions (e.g. the sacrifice of bulls in their mosques during the main religious festivals) survived. This led to the formation of a distinctive Muslim culture, in which the elements of Muslim orthodoxy mixed with religious tolerance formed a relatively liberal society. For instance, the women in Lipka Tatar society traditionally had the same rights and status as men, and could attend non-segregated schools.

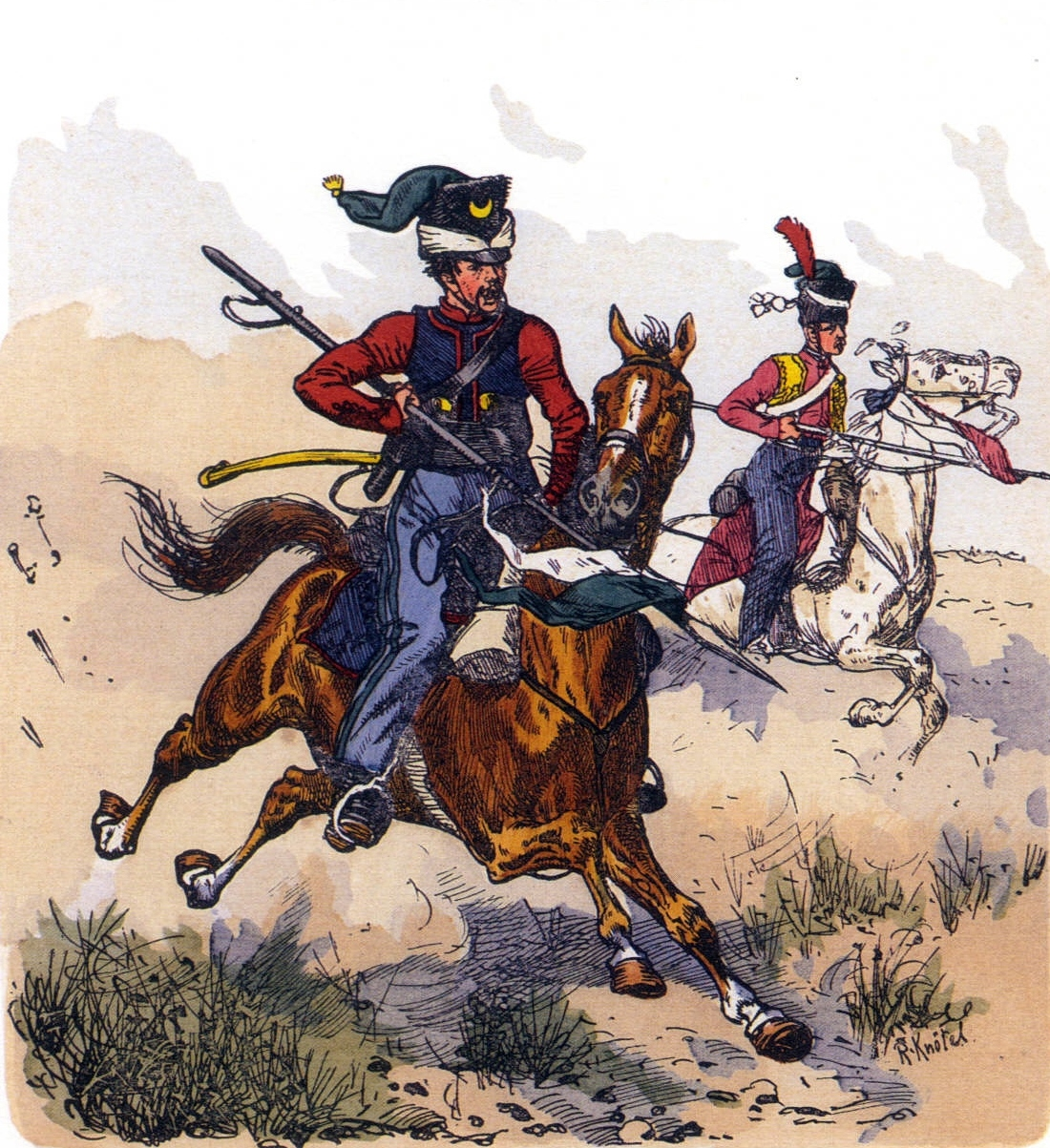
Lithuanian Tartars of the Imperial Guard at the charge, by Richard Knötel

About 5,500 Tatars lived within the inter-war boundaries of Poland (1920–1939), and a Tatar cavalry unit had fought for the country's independence. The Tatars had preserved their cultural identity and sustained a number of Tatar organisations, including Tatar archives and a museum in Vilnius.

The Tatars suffered serious losses during World War II and furthermore, after the border change in 1945, a large part of them found themselves in the Soviet Union. It is estimated that about 3,000 Tatars live in present-day Poland, of which about 500 declared Tatar (rather than Polish) nationality in the 2002 census. There are two Tatar villages (Bohoniki and Kruszyniany) in the north-east of present-day Poland, as well as urban Tatar communities in Warsaw, Gdańsk, Białystok, and Gorzów Wielkopolski. Tatars in Poland sometimes have a Muslim surname with a Polish ending: Ryzwanowicz; other surnames adopted by more assimilated Tatars are Tatara or Tataranowicz or Taterczyński, which literally mean "son of a Tatar".

The Tatars played a relatively prominent role for such a small community in the Polish–Lithuanian Commonwealth military as well as in Polish and Lithuanian political and intellectual life. In modern-day Poland, their presence is also widely known, due in part to their noticeable role in the historical novels of Henryk Sienkiewicz (1846–1916), which are universally recognized in Poland. A number of Polish intellectual figures have also been Tatars, e.g. the prominent historian Jerzy Łojek.

A small community of Polish-speaking Tatars settled in Brooklyn, New York City, in the early 20th century. They established a mosque that remained in use as of 2017.

=== Crimean Tatars ===
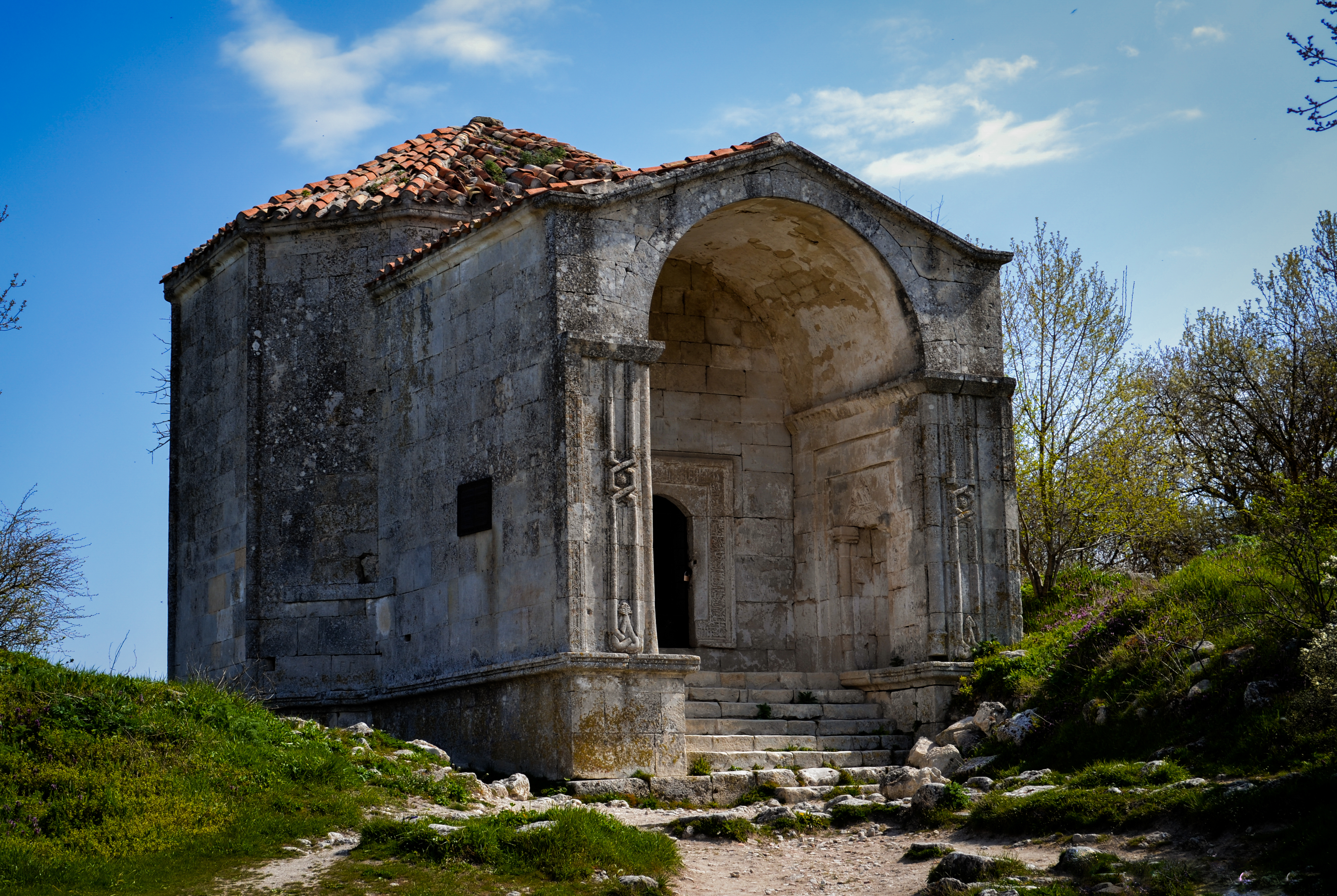
Mausoleum of Canike in Crimea, Qırq Yer

Crimean Tatars are an indigenous people of Crimea. Their formation occurred during the 13th–17th centuries, primarily from Kipchaks from the North, and Ottoman Turks from the South.

At the beginning of the 13th century, Crimea became a part of the Golden Horde. The Tatars of the Golden Horde mostly adopted Islam in the 14th century and thereafter Crimea became one of the centers of Islamic civilization in Eastern Europe. In the same century, trends towards separatism appeared in the Crimean Ulus of the Golden Horde. De facto independence of Crimea from the Golden Horde may be counted since the beginning of the reign in the peninsula of khanum (princess) Canike, daughter of Tokhtamysh, the powerful Khan of the Golden Horde, and wife of Edigey, the founder of the Nogai Horde. During her reign she strongly supported Hacı Giray in the struggle for the Crimean throne until her death in 1437. Following the death of Сanike, the situation of Hacı Giray in Crimea weakened and he was forced to leave Crimea for Lithuania.

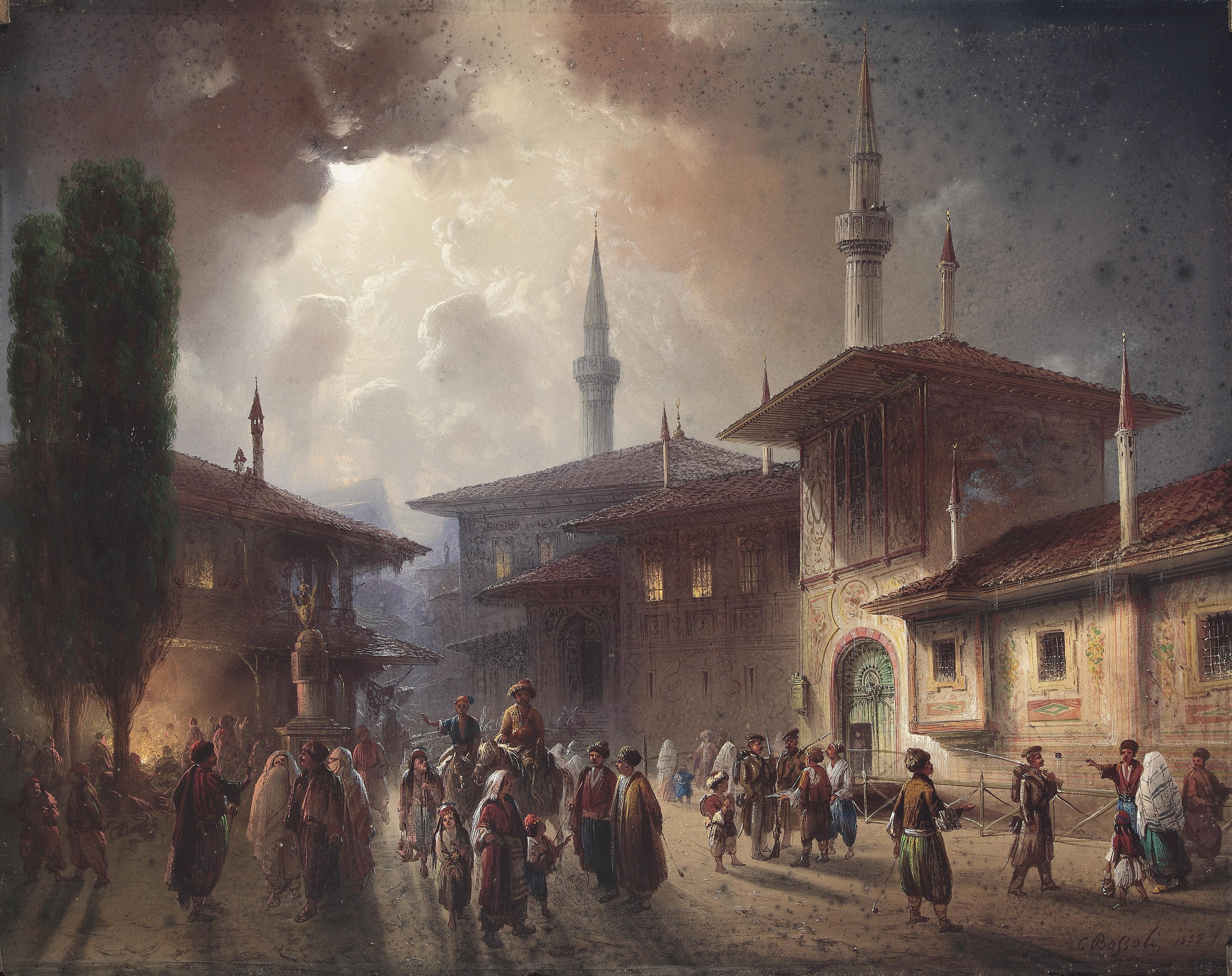
Khan's Palace in Bağçasaray

In 1441, an embassy from the representatives of several strong clans of Crimea, including the Golden Horde clans Shırın and Barın and the Cumanic clan Kıpçak, went to the Grand Duchy of Lithuania to invite Hacı Giray to rule in Crimea. He became the founder of the Giray dynasty, which ruled until the annexation of the Crimean Khanate by Russia in 1783. Hacı I Giray was a Jochid descendant of Genghis Khan and of his grandson Batu Khan of the Golden Horde. In 1502, during the reign of Hacı's son Meñli I Giray, the Crimean Khanate defeated the "Great Horde" (the remnant of the Golden Horde) and captured Sarai. Meñli proclaimed himself the Great Khan and overlord of neighboring khanates. After that, the Crimean Khanate was among the strongest powers in Eastern Europe until the beginning of the 18th century. The Khanate was formally a vassal state of the Ottoman Empire, with great autonomy after 1580. As a Muslim state, the Crimean Khanate had to recognize the Ottoman caliph as the supreme ruler, in fact, the viceroy of God on earth. A major source of income were frequents raids into Eastern Europe and the Caucasus for slaves.

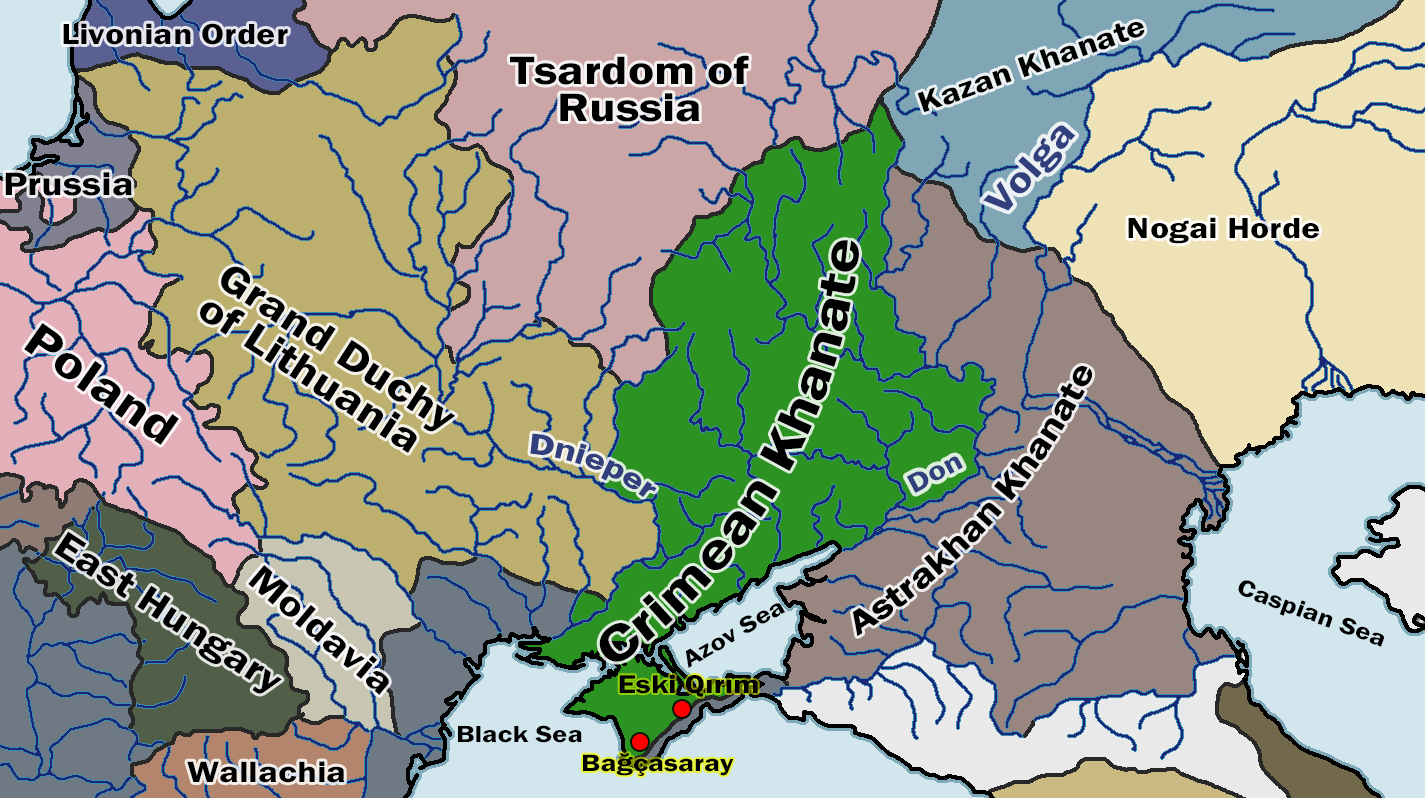
Khanates of Crimea, Astrakhan and Kazan in 1550, before Ivan the Terrible's expansion into the Volga basin

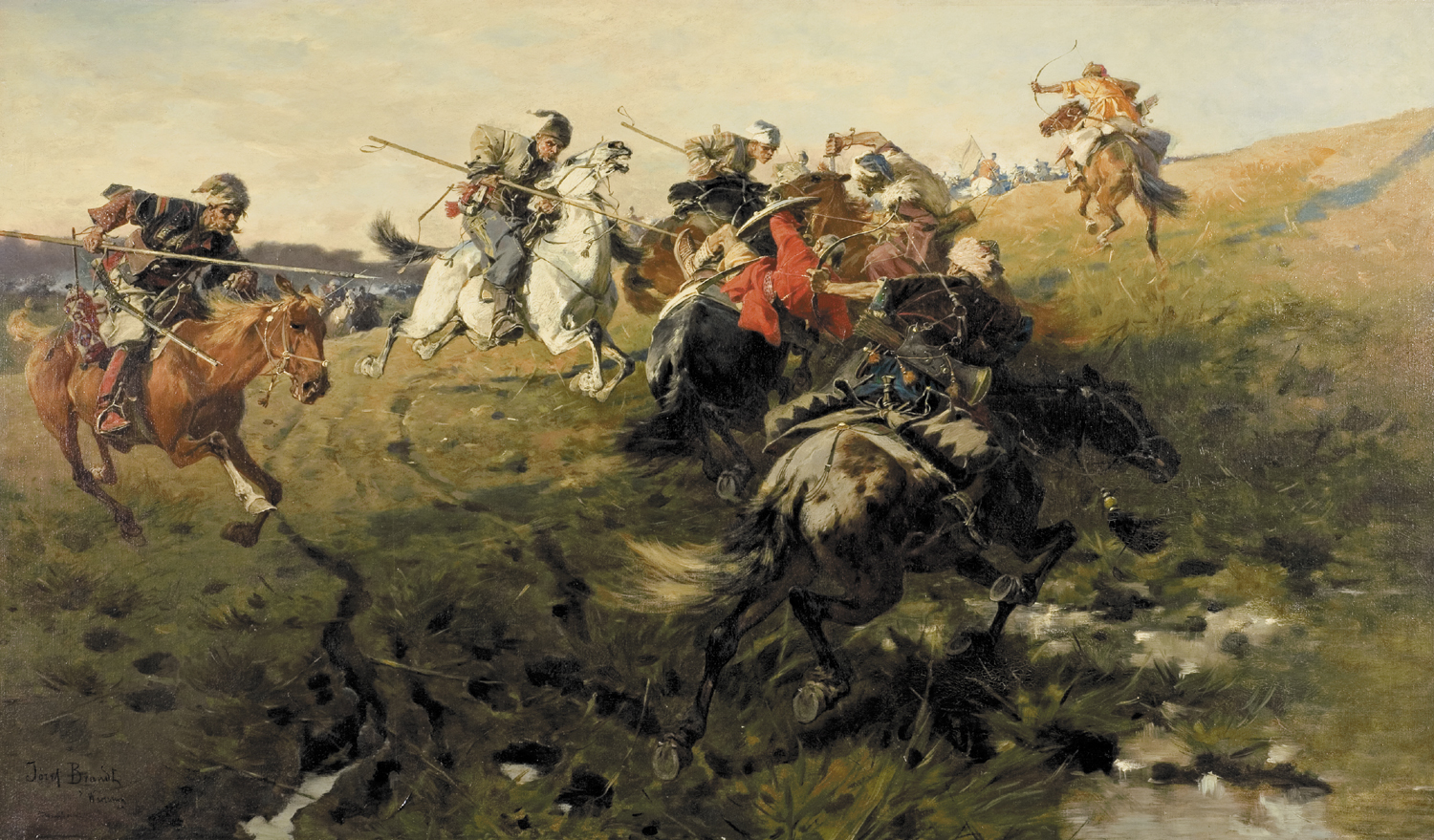
Tatars fighting Zaporozhian Cossacks, by Józef Brandt

The Russo-Turkish War of 1768 to 1774 resulted in the defeat of the Ottomans by the Russians, and according to the Treaty of Küçük Kaynarca (1774) signed after the war, Crimea became independent and the Ottomans renounced their political right to protect the Crimean Khanate. After a period of political unrest in Crimea, Imperial Russia violated the treaty and annexed the Crimean Khanate in 1783.

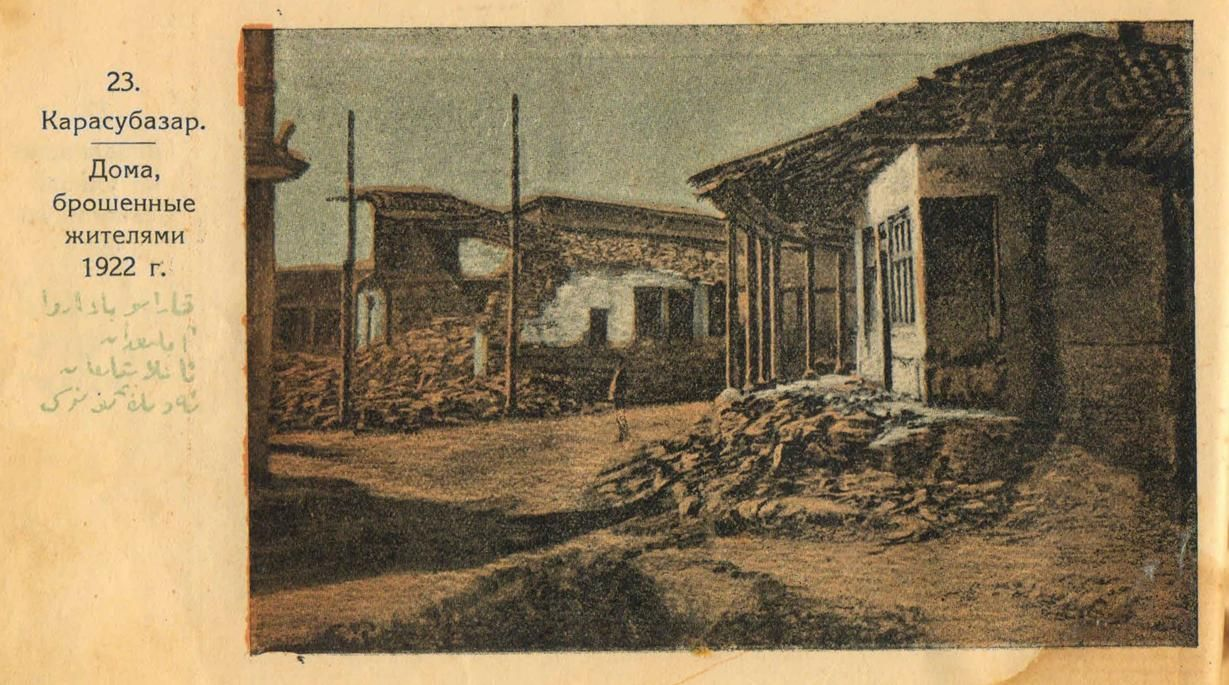
Abandoned houses in Qarasuvbazar

Due to the oppression by the Russian administration, the Crimean Tatars were forced to immigrate to the Ottoman Empire. In total, from 1783 till the beginning of the 20th century, at least 800 thousand Tatars left Crimea. In 1917, the Crimean Tatars, in an effort to recreate their statehood, announced the Crimean People's Republic—the first democratic republic in the Muslim world, where all peoples were equal in rights. The head of the republic was the young politician Noman Çelebicihan. However, a few months later the Bolsheviks captured Crimea, and Çelebicihan was killed without trial and thrown into the Black Sea. Soon in Crimea, Soviet power was established.

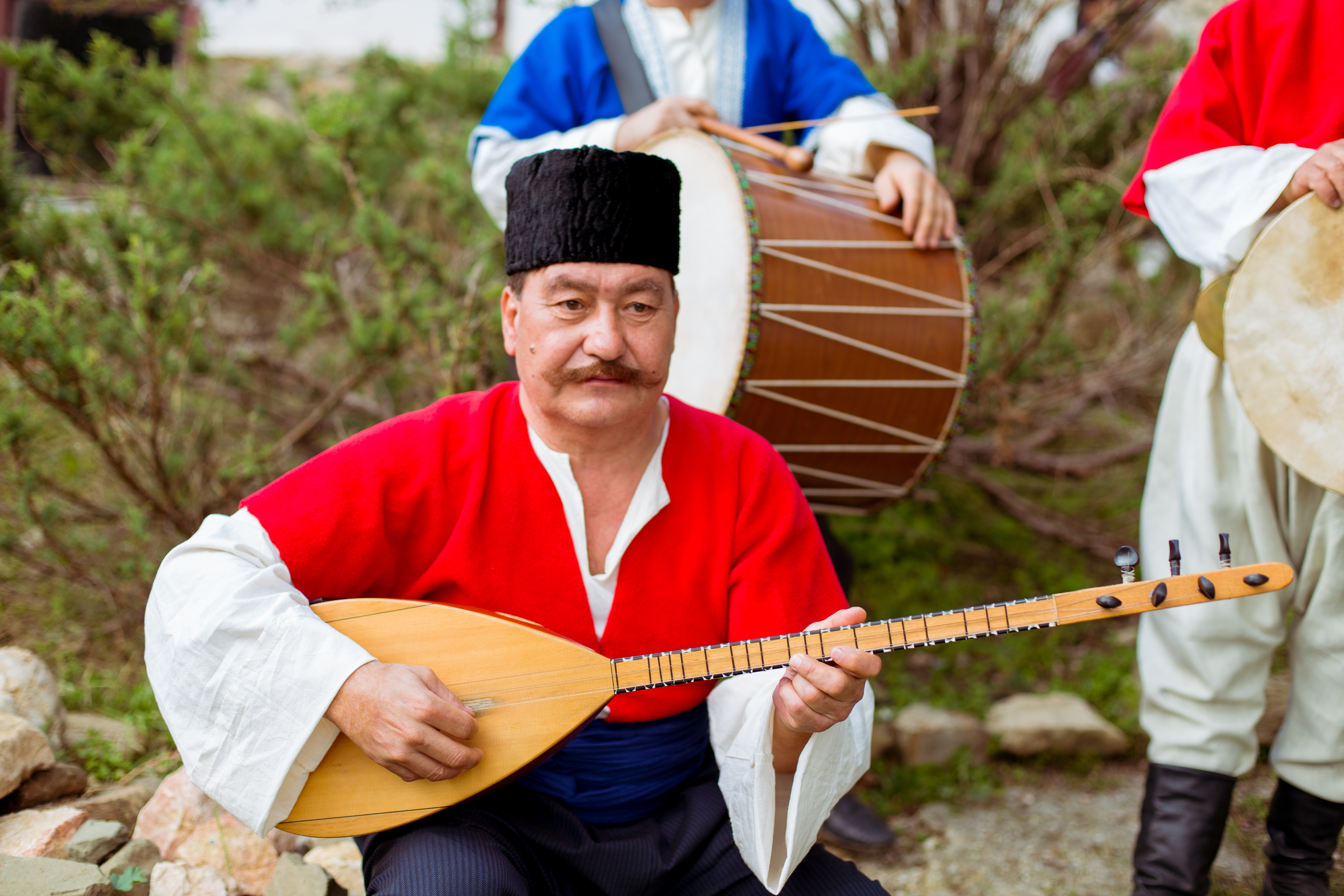
Crimean Tatar musician

Through the fault of the Soviet government, which exported bread from Crimea to other regions of the country, in 1921–1922, at least 76,000 Crimean Tatars died of starvation, which became a disaster for such a small nation. In 1928, the first wave of repression against the Crimean Tatar intelligentsia was launched, in particular, the head of the Crimean ASSR, Veli İbraimov, was executed in a fabricated case. In 1938, the second wave of repression against the Crimean Tatar intelligentsia was started, during which many Crimean Tatar writers, scientists, poets, politicians, teachers were killed (Asan Sabri Ayvazov, Usein Bodaninsky, Seitdzhelil Hattatov, Ilyas Tarhan and many others). In May 1944, the USSR State Defense Committee ordered the total deportation of all the Crimean Tatars from Crimea. The deportees were transported in cattle trains to Central Asia, primarily to Uzbekistan. During the deportation and in the first years of being in exile, 46% of Crimean Tatars died. In 1956, Khrushchev exposed Stalin's cult of personality and allowed deported peoples to return to their homeland. The exception was the Crimean Tatars. Since then, a powerful national movement of the Crimean Tatars, supported abroad and by Soviet dissidents, began, and in 1989 the Supreme Soviet of the Soviet Union was made to condemn the deportation of Crimean Tatars from their motherland as inhumane and lawless. Crimean Tatars began to return to their homeland. Today, Crimean Tatars constitute approximately 12% of the population of Crimea. There is a large diaspora in Turkey and Uzbekistan, but most (especially in Turkey) of them do not consider themselves Crimean Tatars. Still, there remains a diaspora in Dobruja, where most of the Tatars keep identifying themselves as Crimean Tatars.

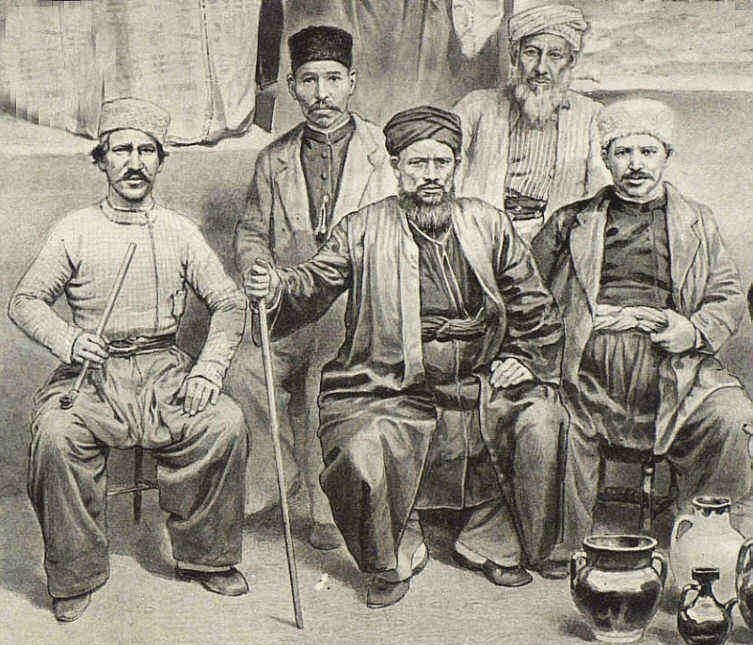
Steppe Crimean Tatars

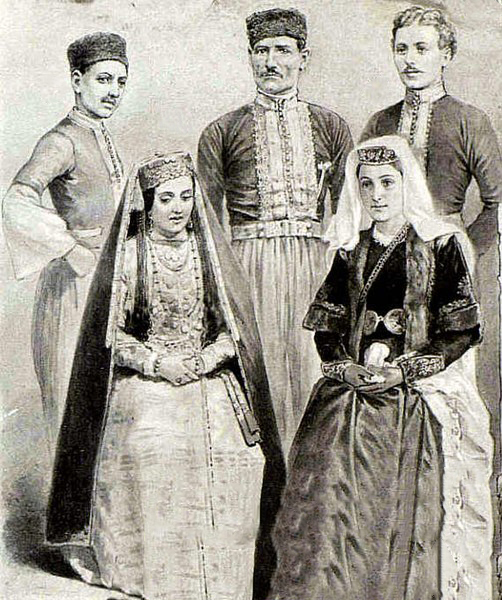
Tat and Yaliboylu Crimean Tatars

Nowadays, the Crimean Tatars comprise three sub-ethnic groups:

- the Tats (not to be confused with Tat people, living in the Caucasus region) who used to inhabit the Crimean Mountains before 1944
- the Yalıboylu who lived on the southern coast of the peninsula
- the Noğays who used to live in the northern part of the Crimea

==== Crimean Tatars in Dobruja ====
Some Crimean Tatars have lived in the territory of today's Romania and Bulgaria since the 13th century. In Romania, according to the 2002 census, 24,000 people declared their ethnicity as Tatar, most of them being Crimean Tatars living in Constanța County in the region of Dobruja. Most of the Crimean Tatars, living in Romania and Bulgaria nowadays, left the Crimean peninsula for Dobruja after the annexation of Crimea by the Russian Empire.

Dobrujan Tatars have been present in Romania since the 13th century. The Tatars first reached the mouths of the Danube in the mid-13th century at the height of the power of the Golden Horde. In the 14th and 15th centuries the Ottoman Empire colonized Dobruja with Nogais from Budjak. Between 1593 and 1595 Tatars from Nogai and Budjak were also settled to Dobruja. Toward the end of the 16th century, about 30,000 Nogai Tatars from the Budjak were brought to Dobruja. After the Russian annexation of Crimea in 1783 Crimean Tatars began emigrating to the Ottoman coastal provinces of Dobruja (today divided between Romania and Bulgaria). Once in Dobruja most settled in the areas surrounding Mecidiye, Babadag, Köstence, Tulça, Silistre, Beştepe, or Varna and went on to create villages named in honor of their abandoned homeland such as Şirin, Yayla, Akmecit, Yalta, Kefe or Beybucak. Tatars together with Albanians served as gendarmes, who were held in high esteem by the Ottomans and received special tax privileges. The Ottomans additionally accorded a certain degree of autonomy for the Tatars who were allowed governance by their own kaymakam, Khan Mirza. The Giray dynasty (1427–1878) multiplied in Dobruja and maintained their respected position. A Dobrujan Tatar, Kara Hussein, was responsible for the destruction of the Janissary corps on orders from Sultan Mahmut II.

=== Siberian Tatars ===
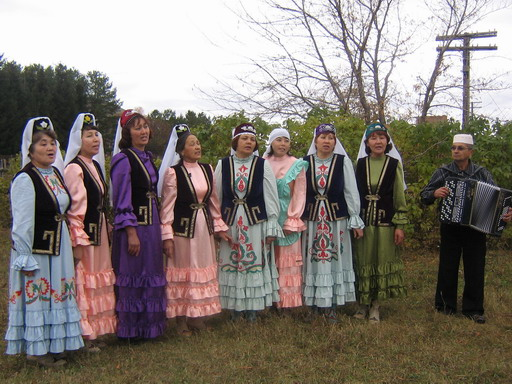
Siberian Tatar folklore group Naza from Omsk Oblast

The Siberian Tatars occupy three distinct regions:

- a strip running west to east from Tobolsk to Tomsk
- the Altay and its spurs
- South Yeniseisk

They originated in the agglomerations of various indigenous North Asian groups which, in the region north of the Altay, reached some degree of culture between the 4th and 5th centuries, but were subdued and enslaved by the Mongols. The 2010 census recorded 6,779 Siberian Tatars in Russia. According to the 2002 census there are 500,000 Tatars in Siberia, but 400,000 of them are Volga Tatars who settled in Siberia during periods of colonization.

== Population of Tatars, 1926–2021 ==
Tatars in Russia (1926–2021)
Census	1926	1939	1959	1970	1979	1989	2002	2010	2021
Population	3,926,053	3,682,956	4,074,253	4,577,061	5,055,757	5,522,096	5,554,601	5,310,649	4,713,669
Percentage	3.89%	3.40%	3.47%	3.52%	3.68%	3.75%	3.87%	3.87%	3.61%

== Gallery ==
Flags

Flags

Flag of the Crimean Tatars

Flag of Tatarstan

Flag of Siberian Tatars

Flag of Lipka Tatars

Flag of the Kazan Khanate

Flag of the Crimean Khanate

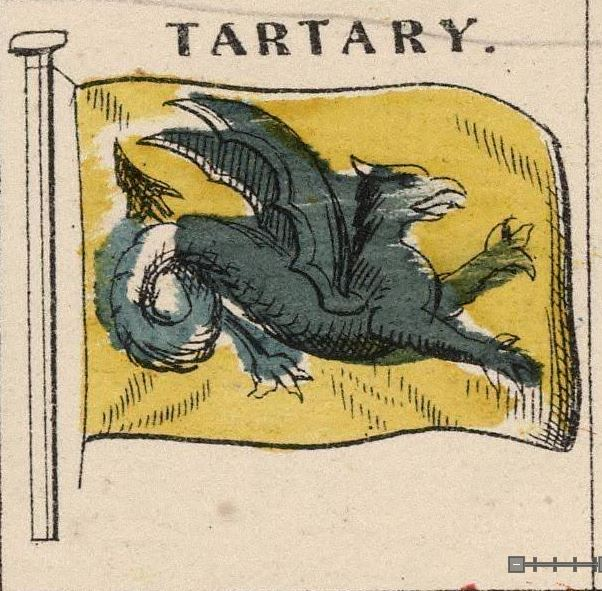
Tartary flag

Paintings

Paintings

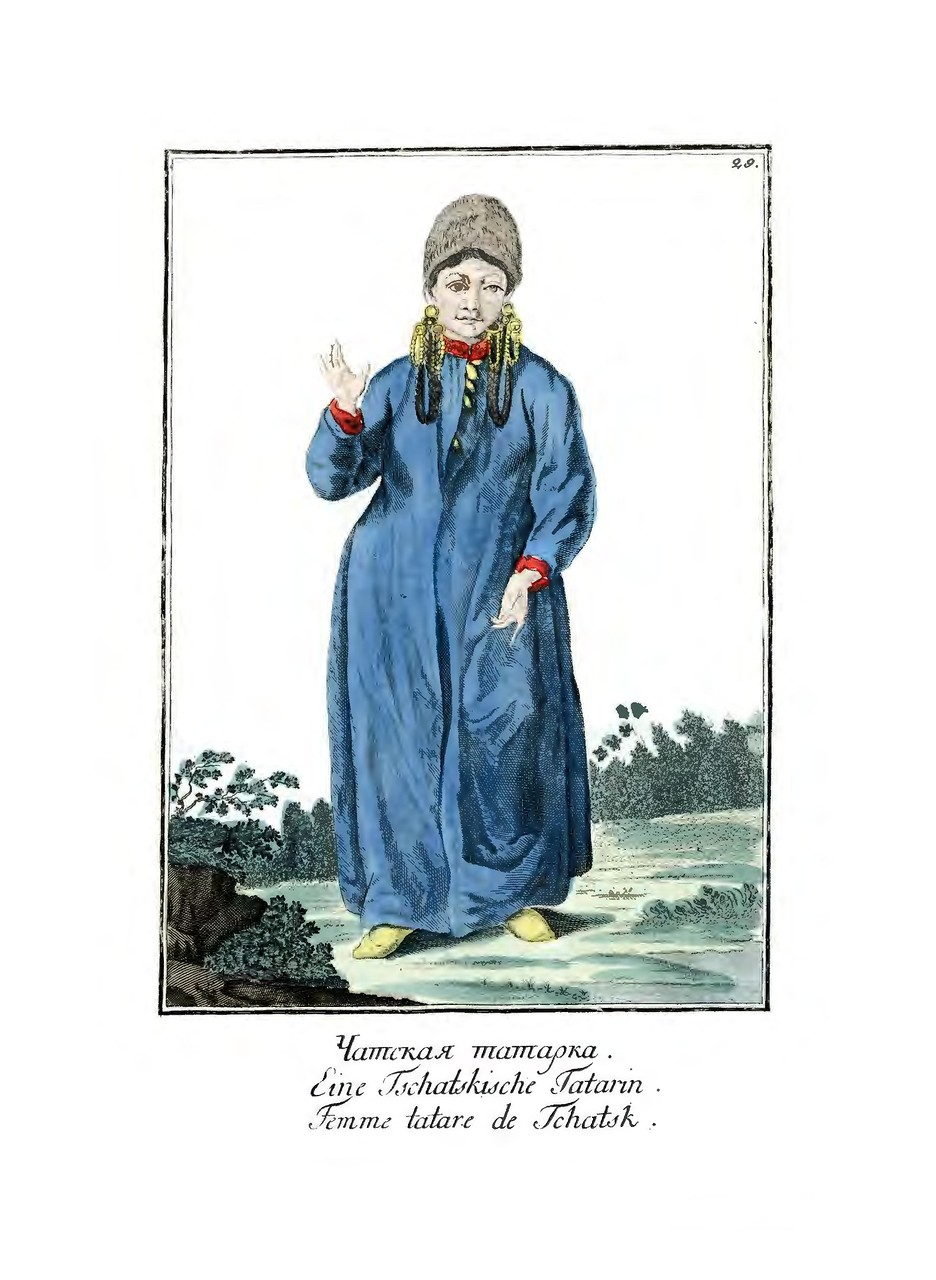
Chat Tatar woman

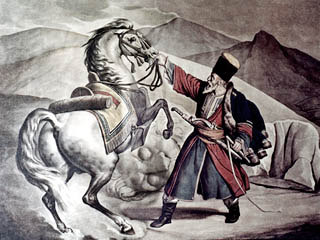
Tatar elder and his horse

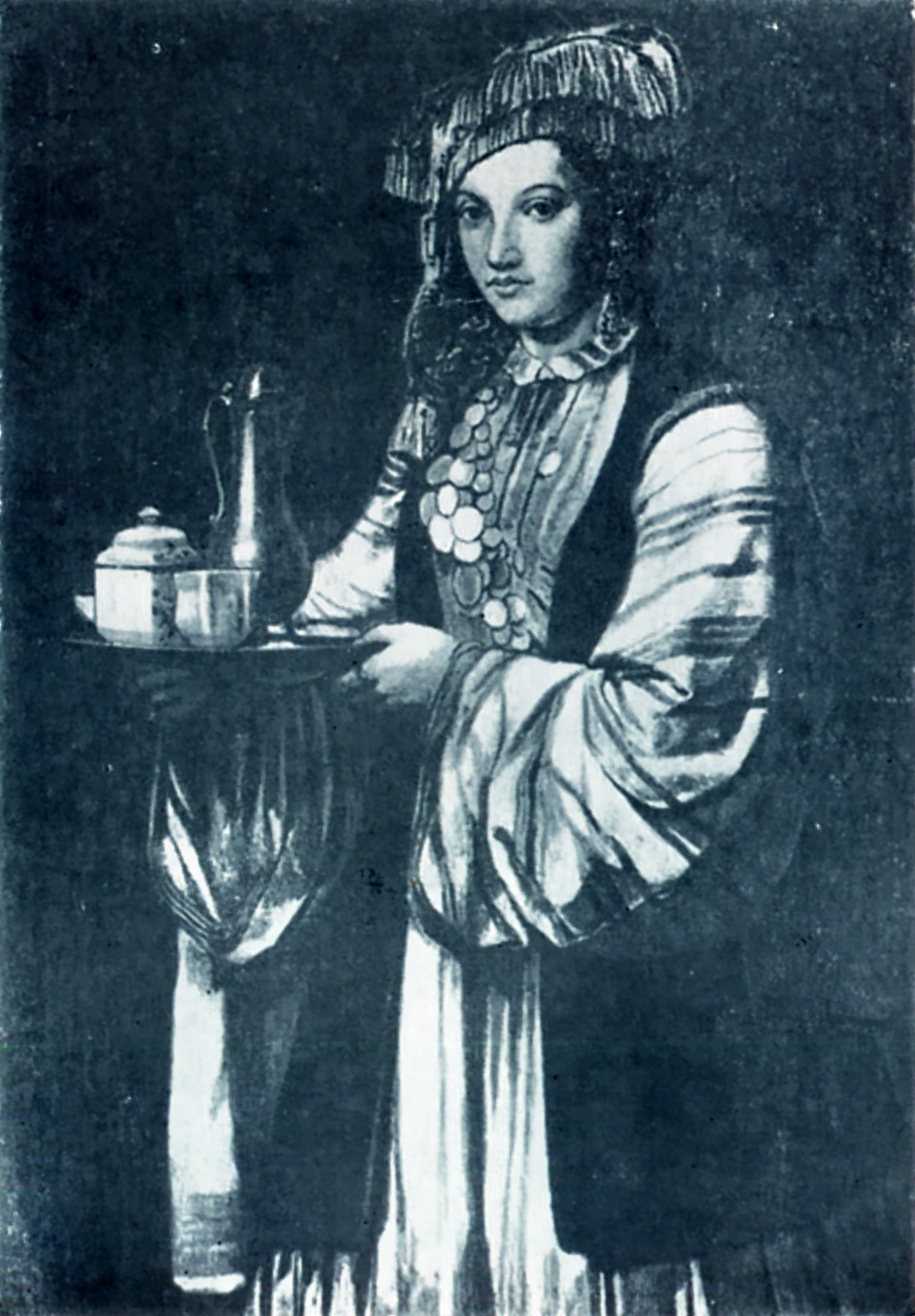
Tatar woman

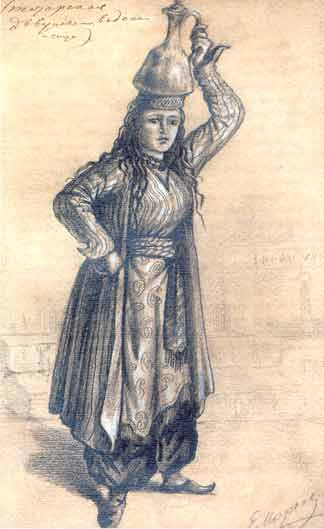
Crimean Tatar woman

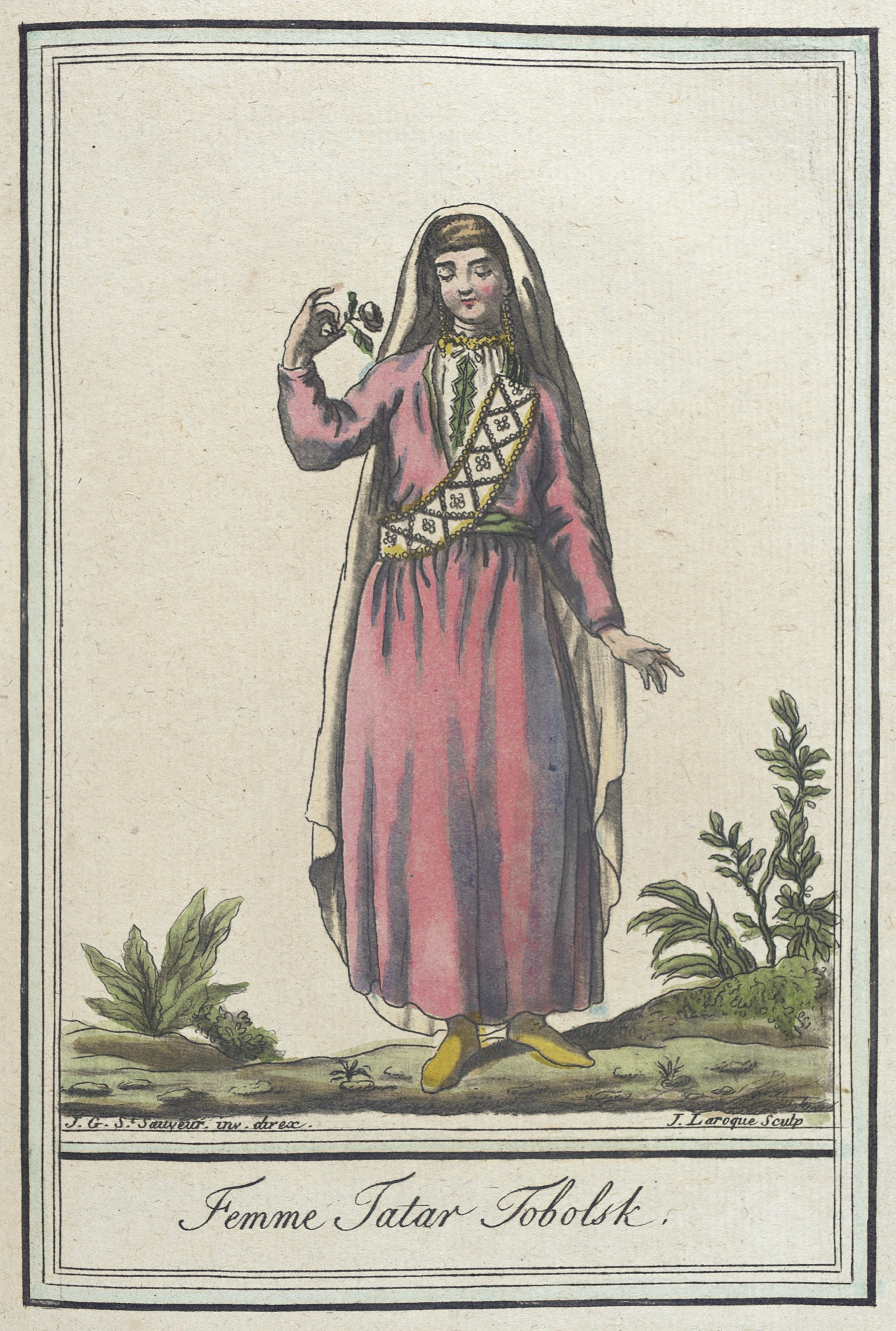
Tatar woman from Tobolsk

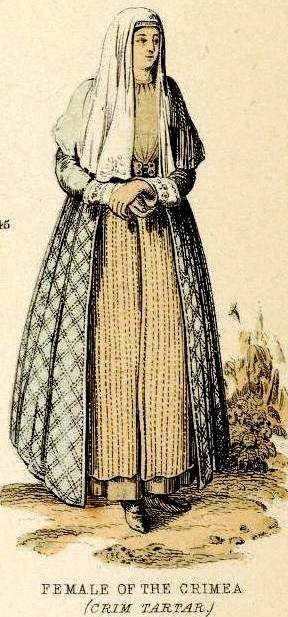
Crimean Tatar woman

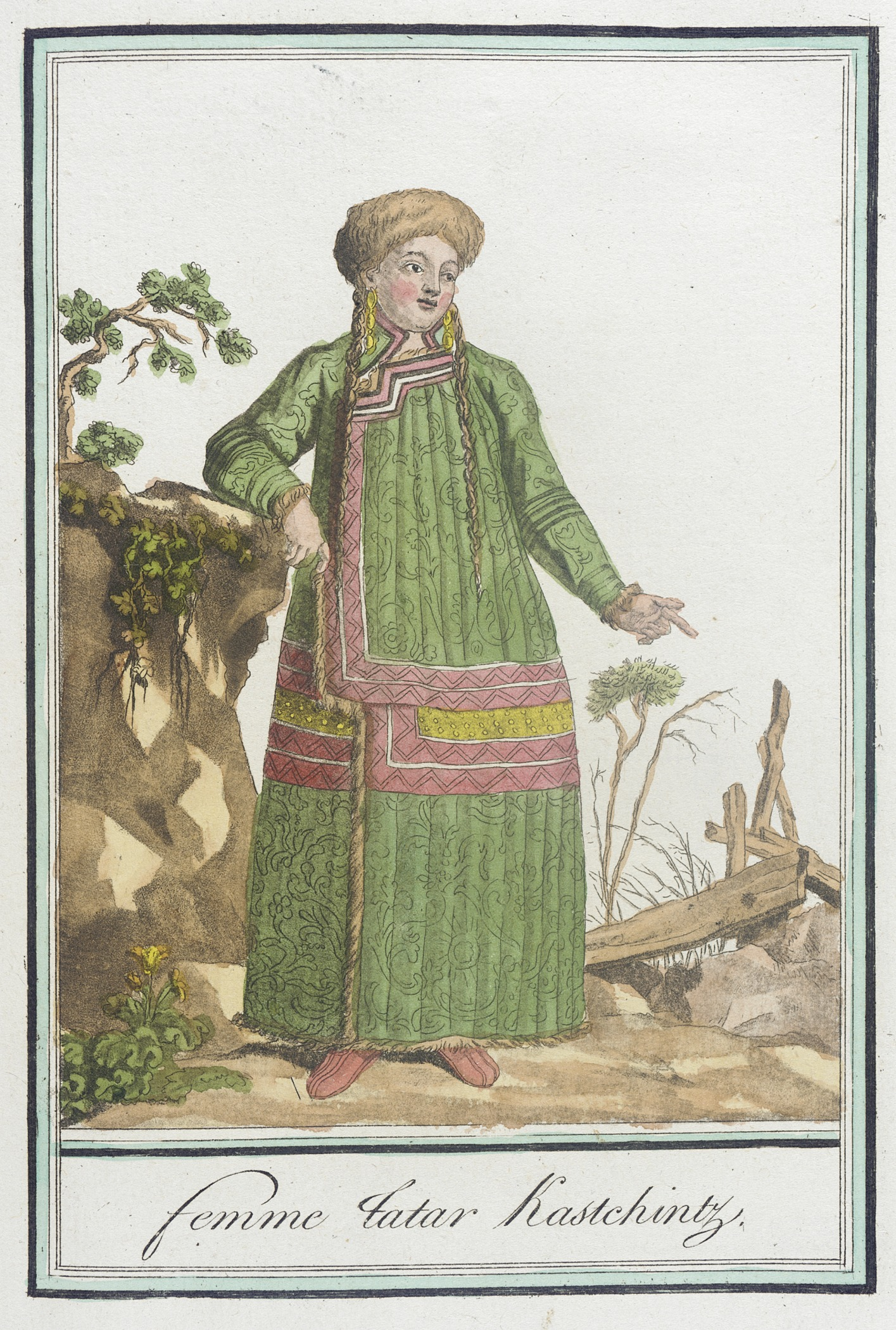
Tatar woman

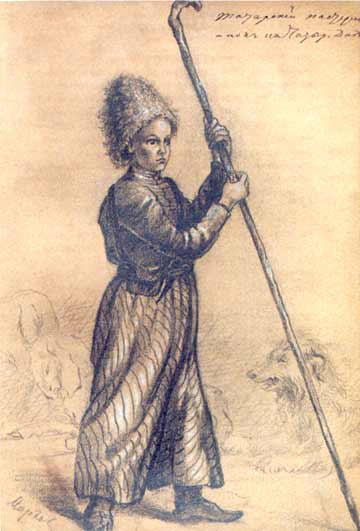
Crimean Tatar shepherd-boy

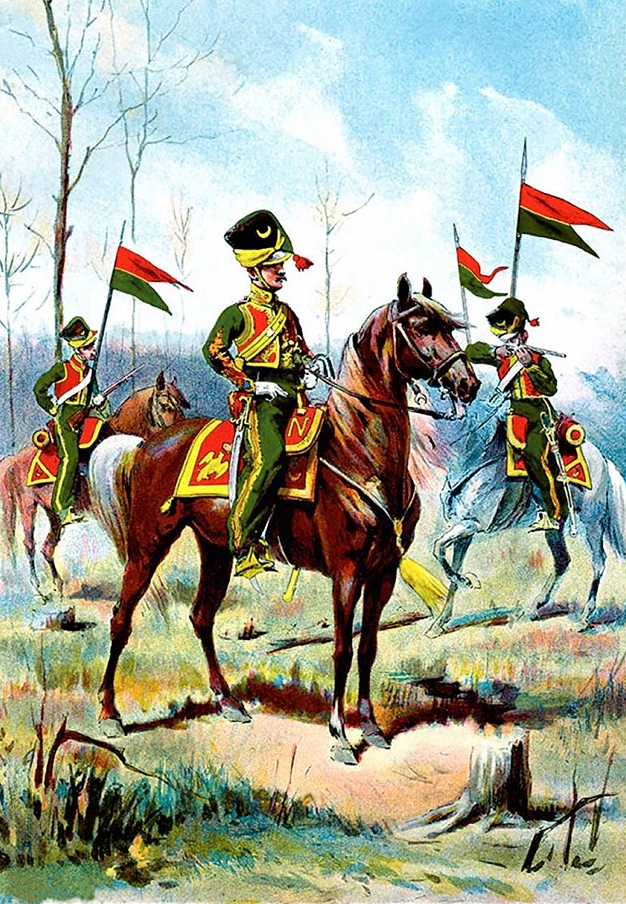
Lithuanian Tatars of Napoleonic army

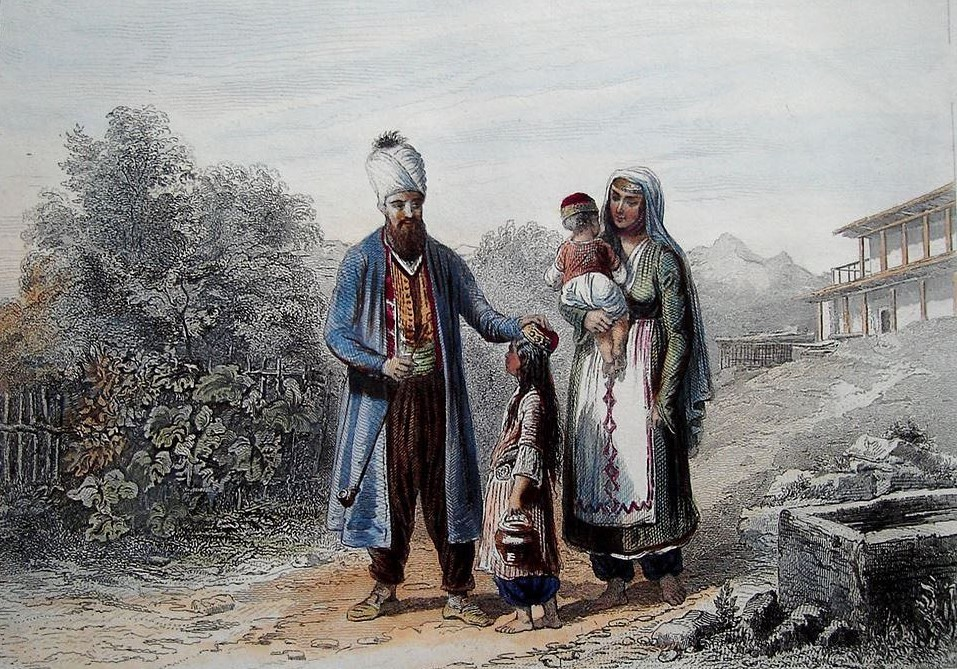
Crimean Tatar family, 1840

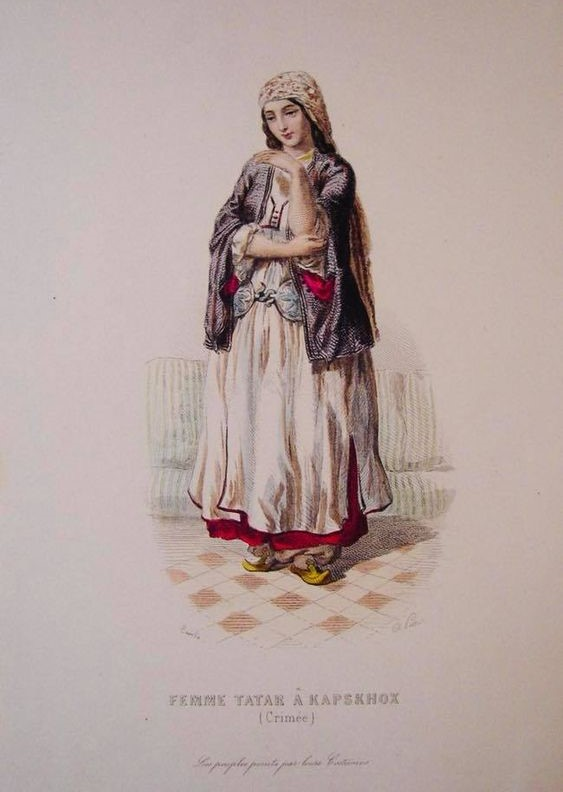
Crimean Tatar girl from Kapsikhor

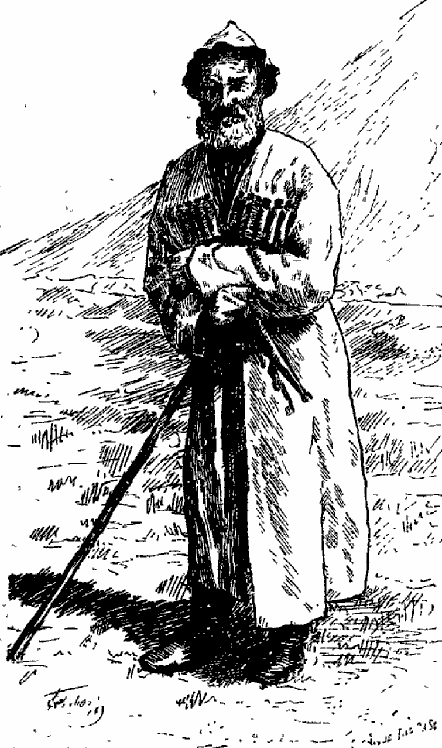
Daghestani Tatar elder

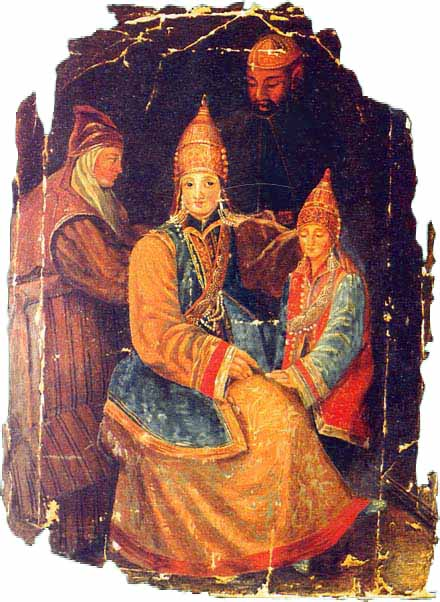
Tatar Queen Söyembikä and
her son, Ötemish Giray Khan

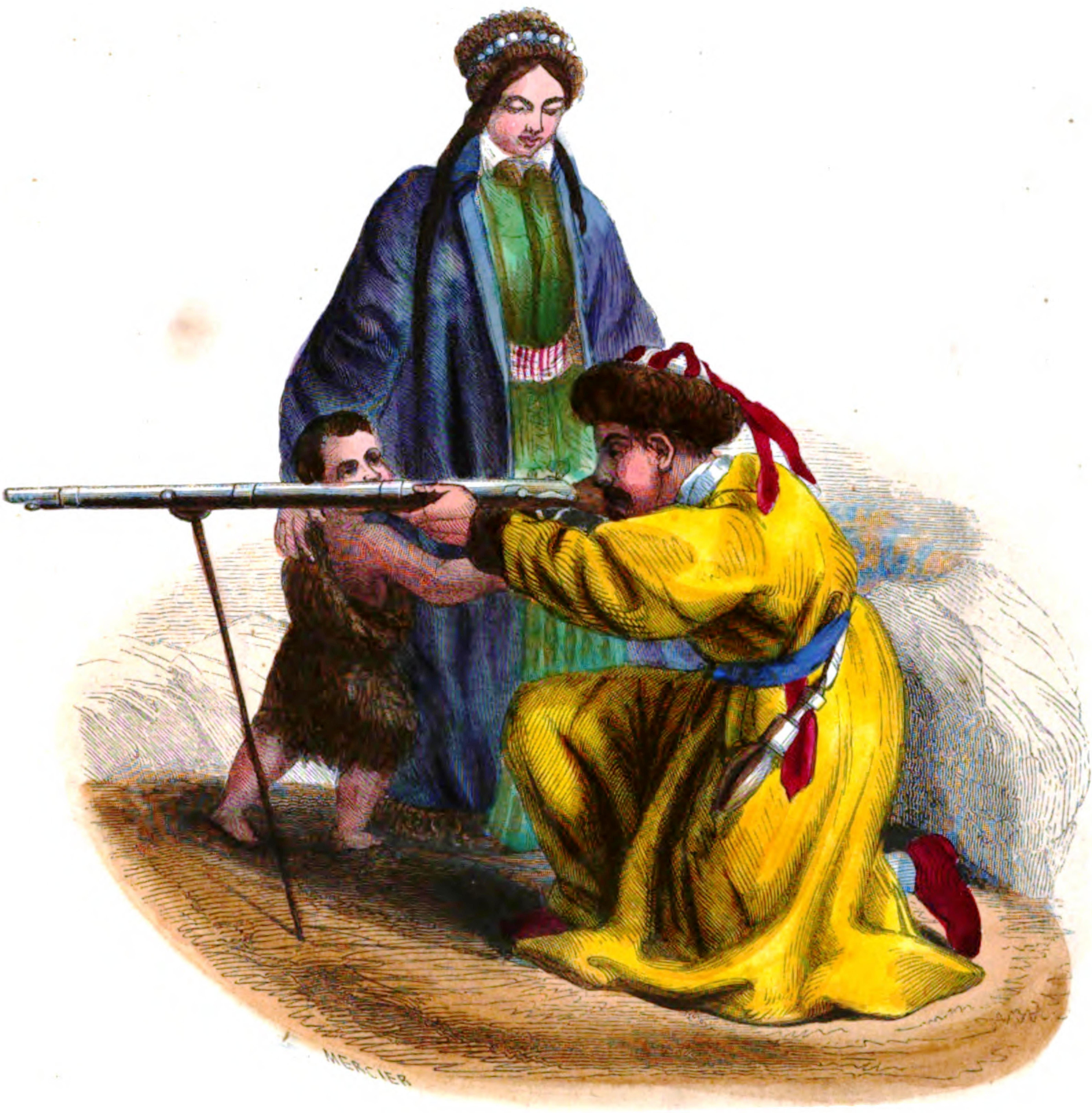
Tatar family in 1843

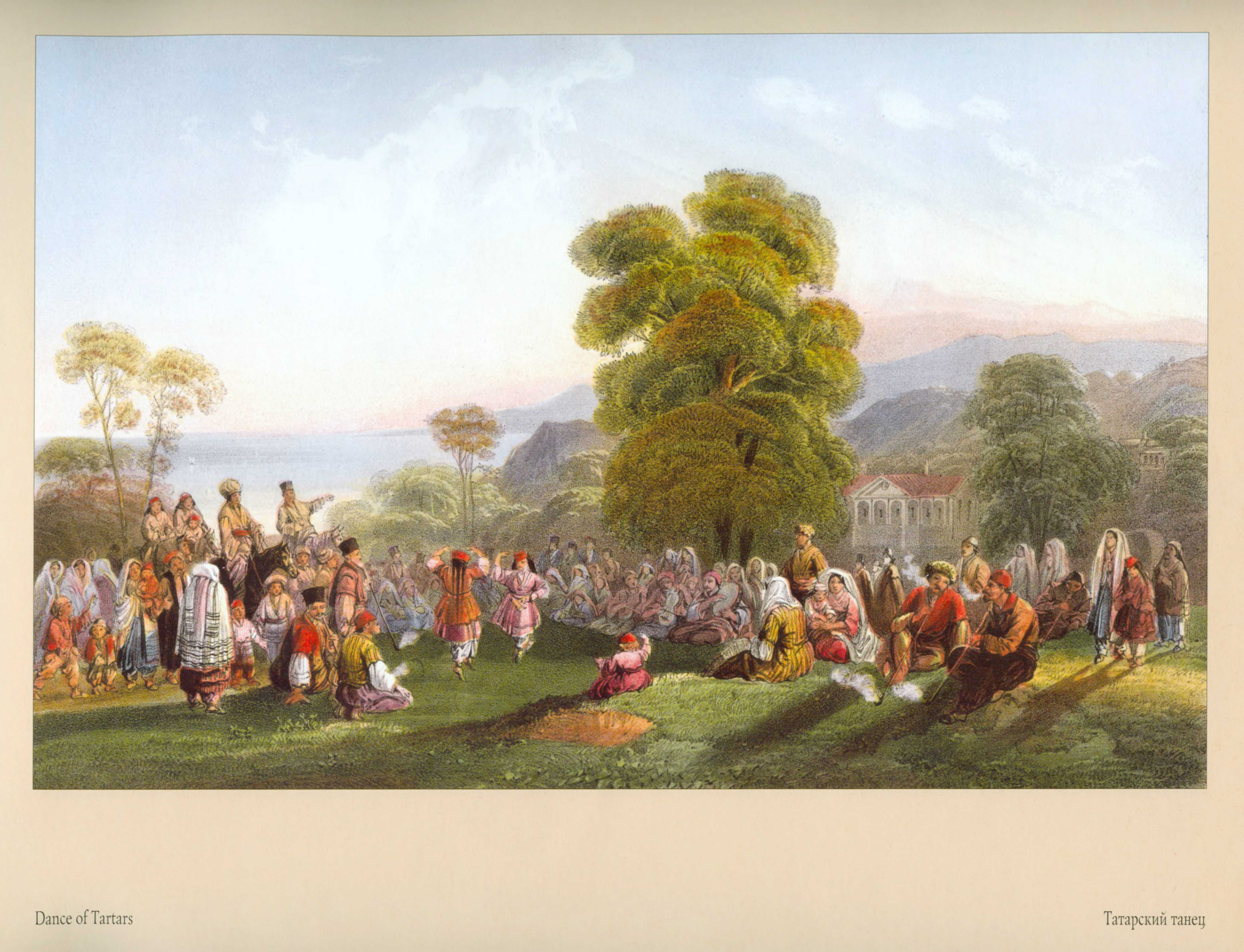
Dance of Crimean Tatars. Crimea, 1856.

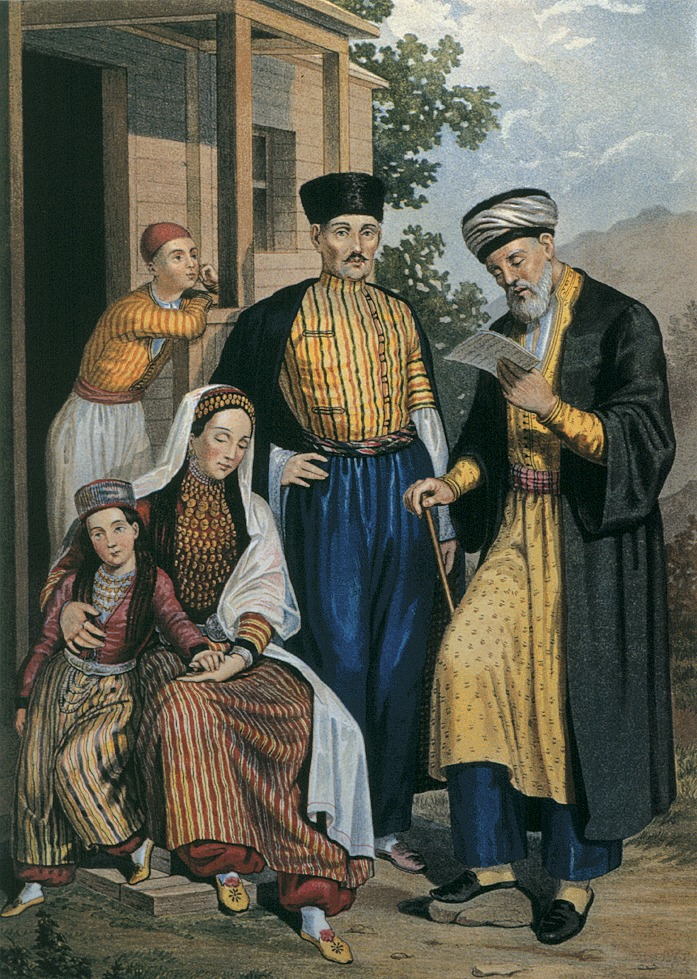
Crimean Tatar family and a mullah

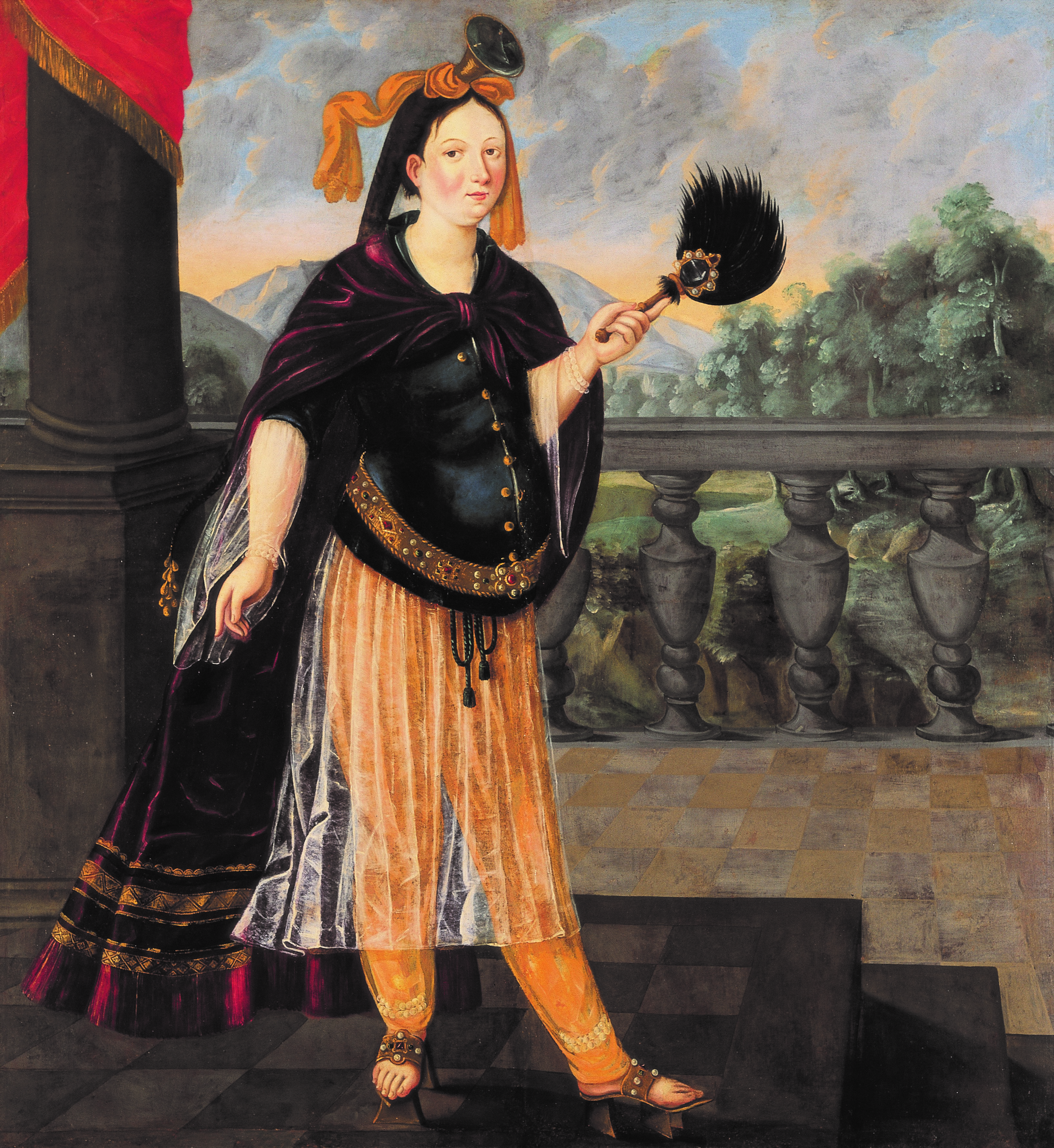
Crimean Tatar princess in 1682

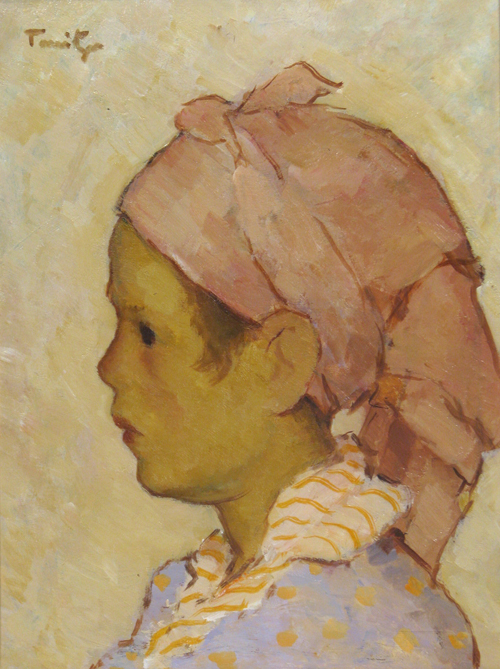
Tatar child ca. 19th century

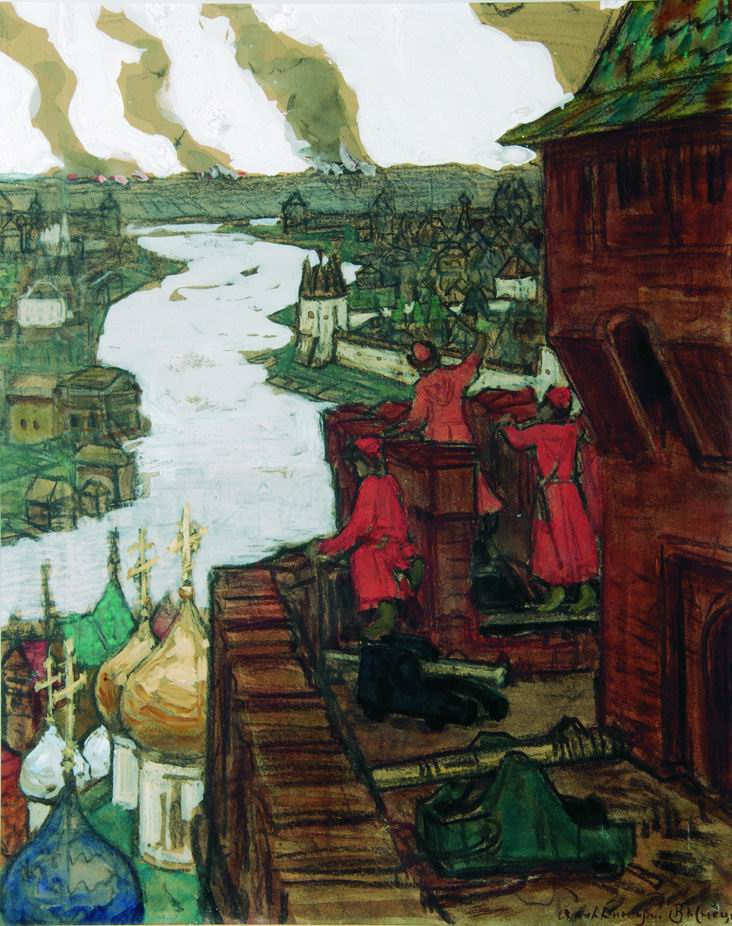
Tatars' raid on Moscow

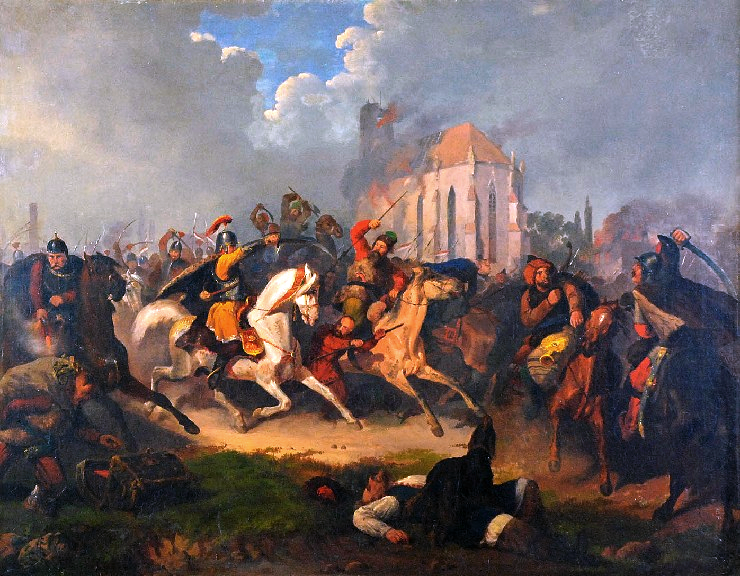
Recovery of Tatar captives

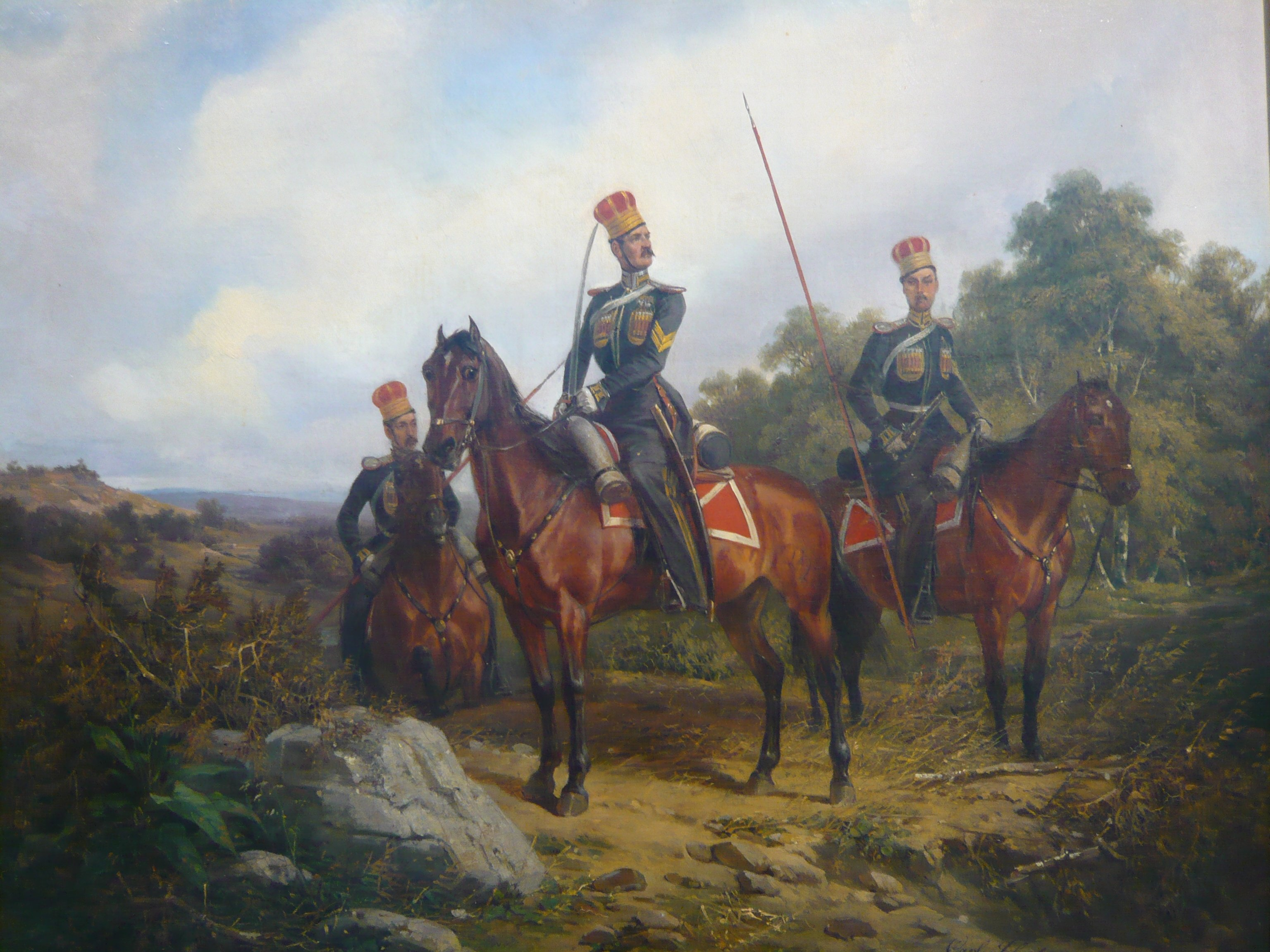
Crimean Tatar squadrone of the Russian empire

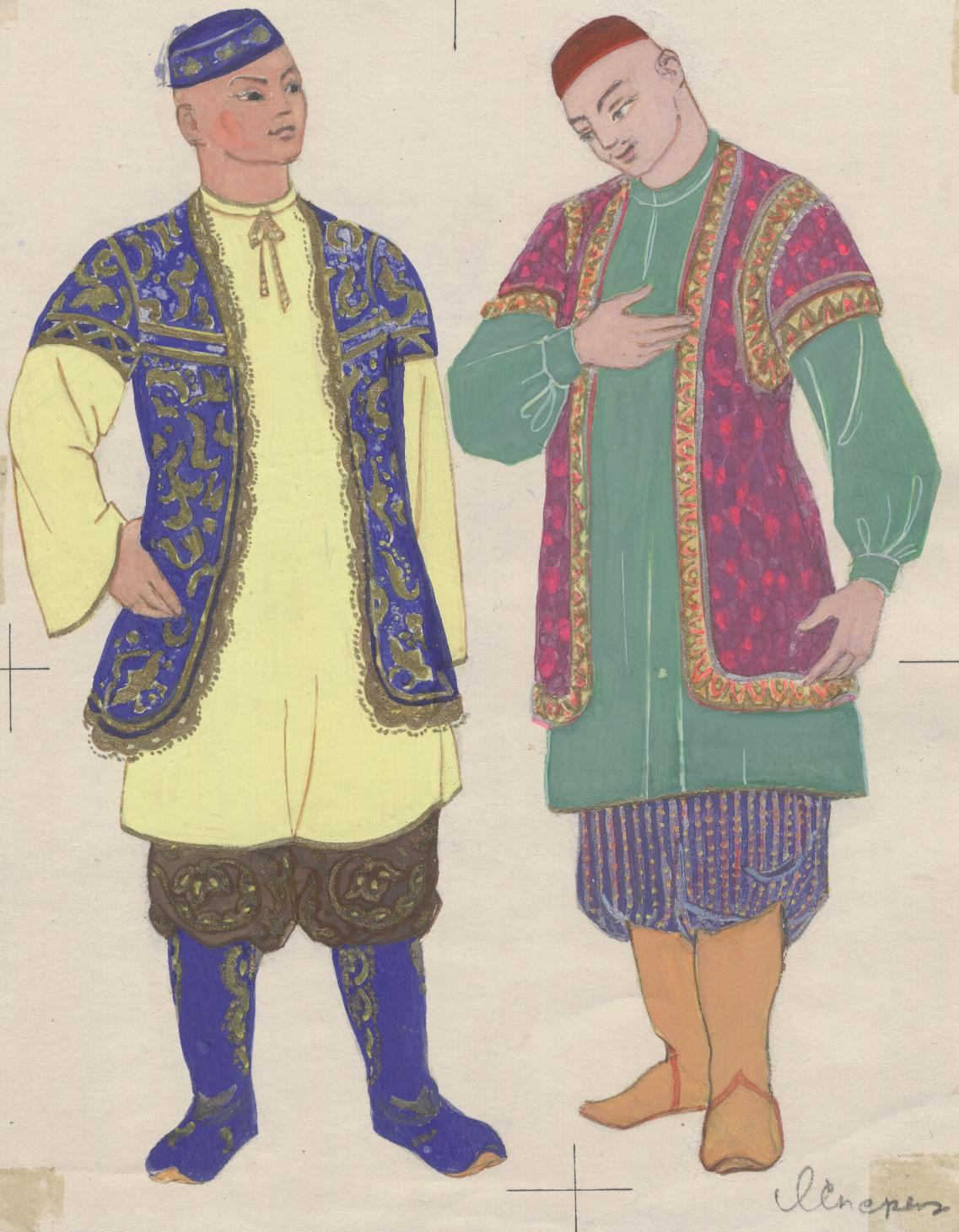
Tatar costumes

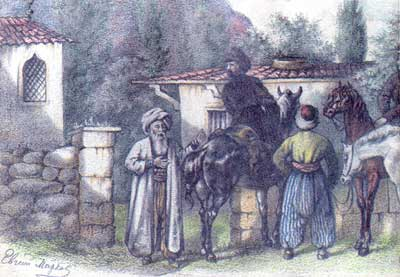
Crimean Tatar elder inviting guests

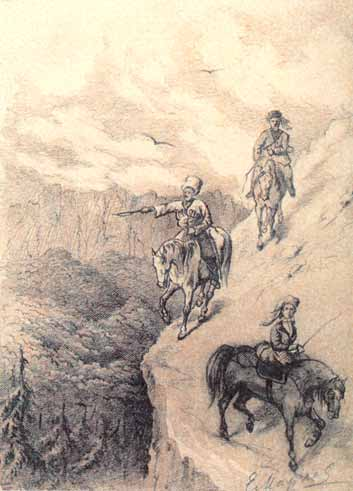
Tatar horsemen

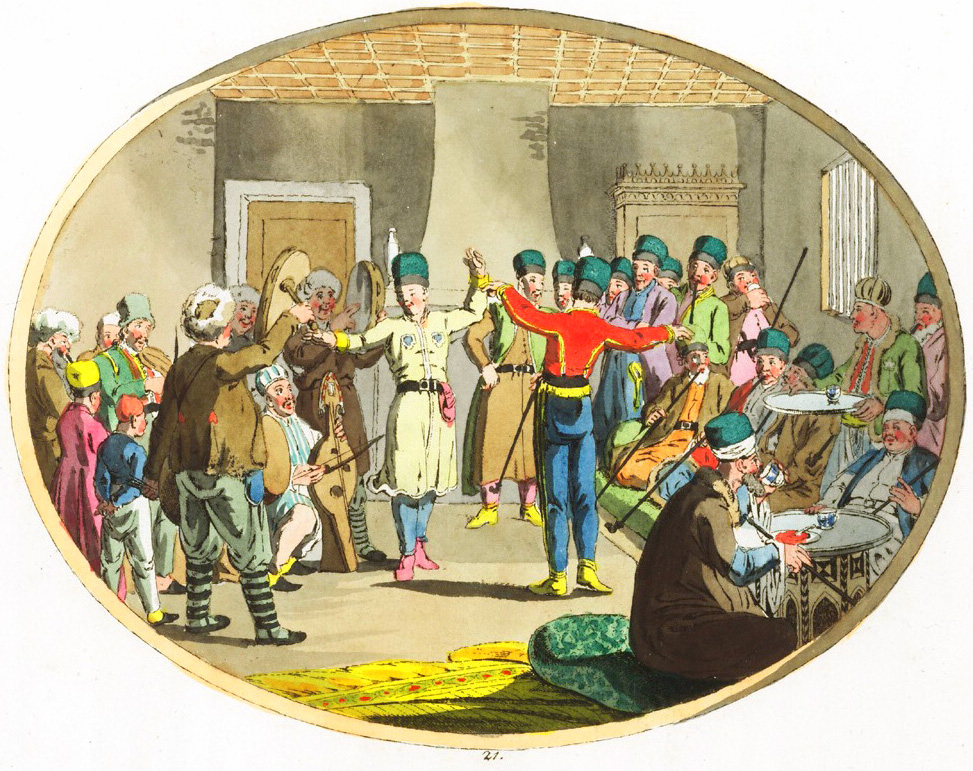
Crimean Tatar's national dance

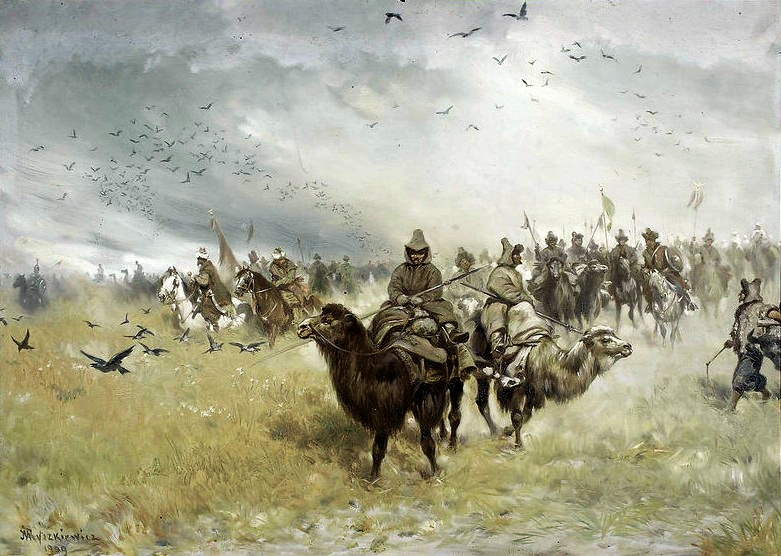
Tatars in the vanguard of the Ottoman army

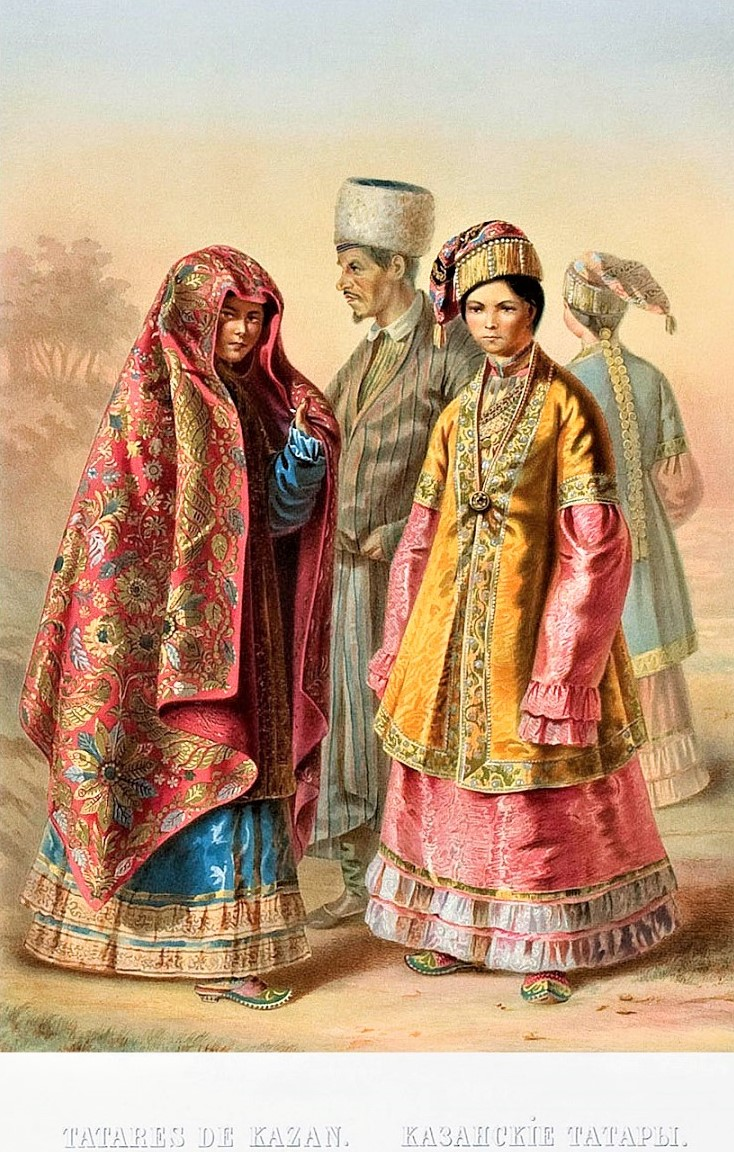
Kazan Tatars 1862

Language

Language

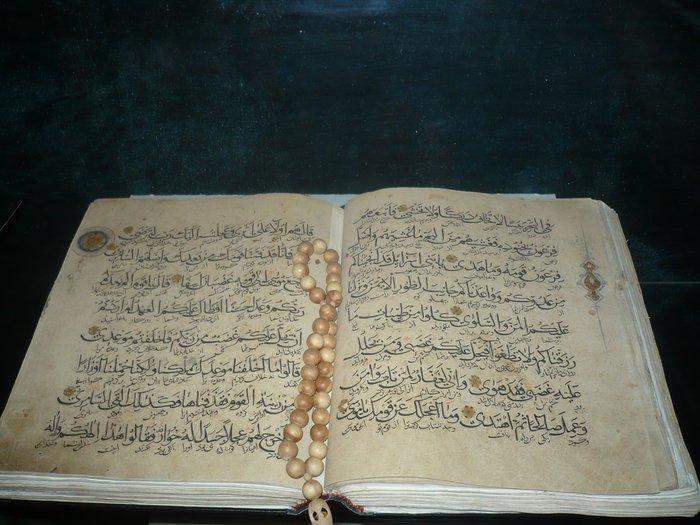
Quran of the Tatars

The word Qazan – قازان is written in Yaña imlâ in the semblance of a Zilant.

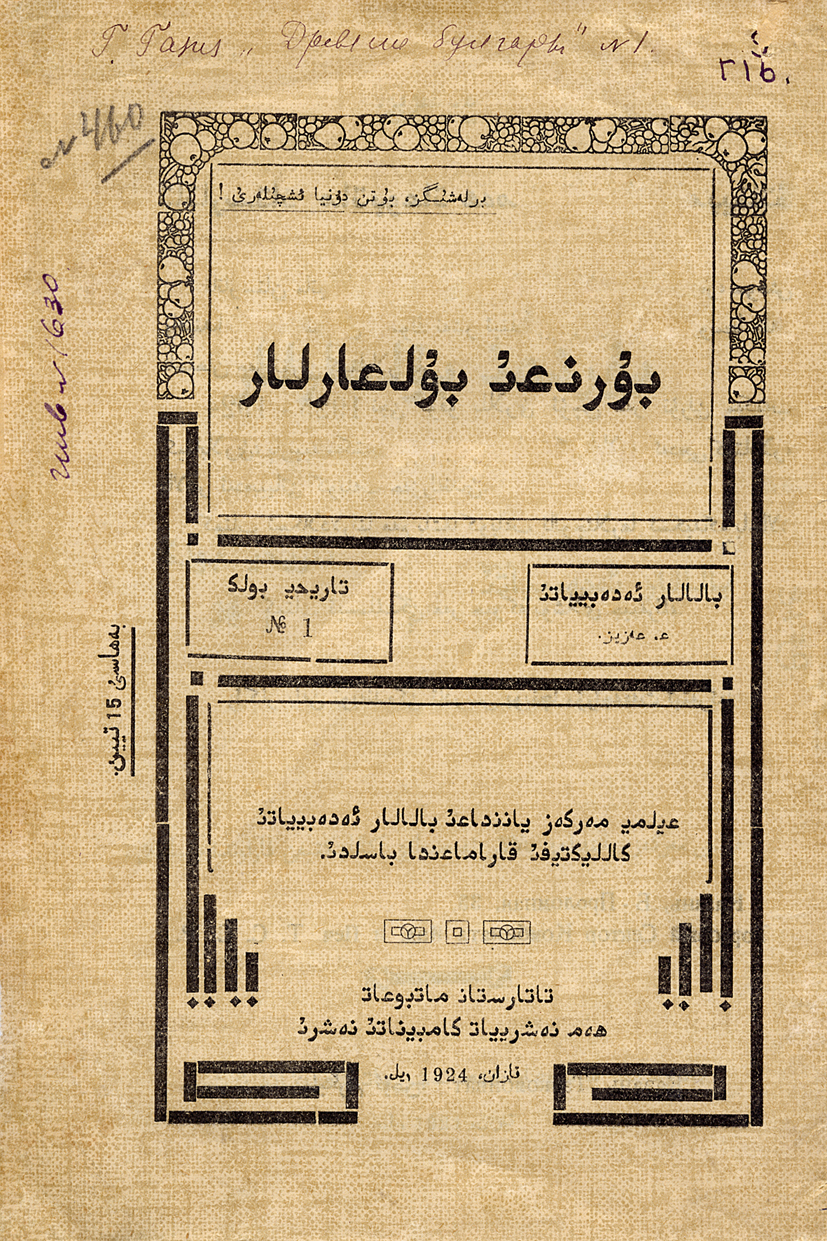
Cover page of Tatar Yana imla book, printed with Separated Tatar language in Arabic script in 1924

A Tatar alphabet book printed in 1778. Arabic script is used, Cyrillic text is in Russian. Хальфин, Сагит. Азбука татарского языка. — М., 1778. — 52 с.

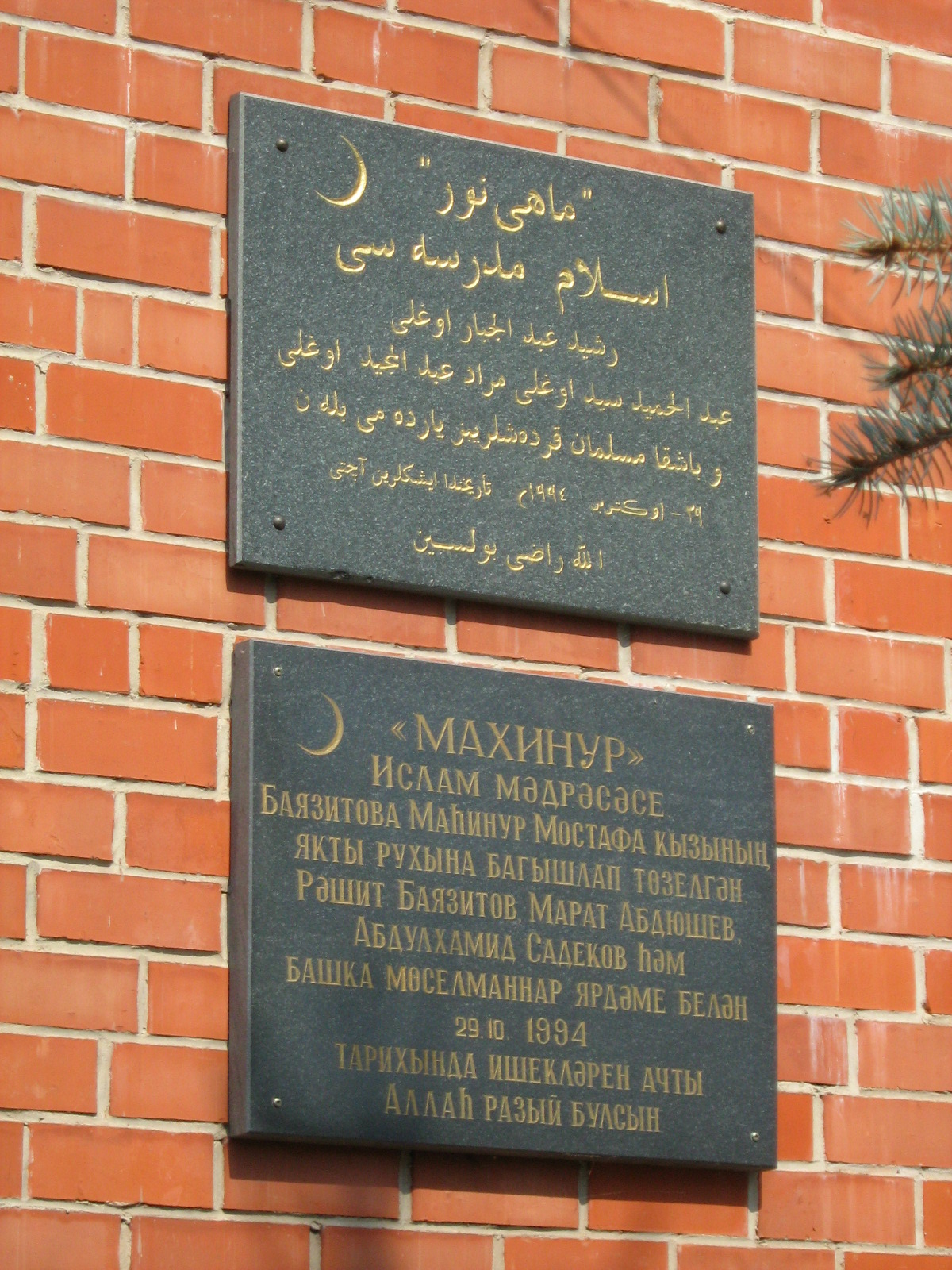
Tatar sign on a madrasah in Nizhny Novgorod, written in both Farsi and Cyrillic Tatar scripts

== See also ==
- List of Tatars
- Zabolotnie Tatars
- Cossacks
- Besermyan
- Lists of battles of the Mongol invasion of Europe
- Tatarophobia
- Tatar name
- Uhlan
- Serving Tatars
