= Tobol Tatars =

Subgroup of Tobol-Irtysh Tatars

Regions with significant populations
- Tyumen Oblast

Languages
- Tobol-Irtysh dialect of Siberian Tatar, Russian

Religion
- Sunni Islam, Shamanism

The Tobol Tatars are a sub-group of Siberian Tatars in Tyumen oblast. Tobol Tatars are settled along the rivers Irtysh, Tobol, Iset, Tura, Pyshma, Tavda, Noska, and Layma in Tyumen Oblast. Their historical administrative center was the town of Qashliq.

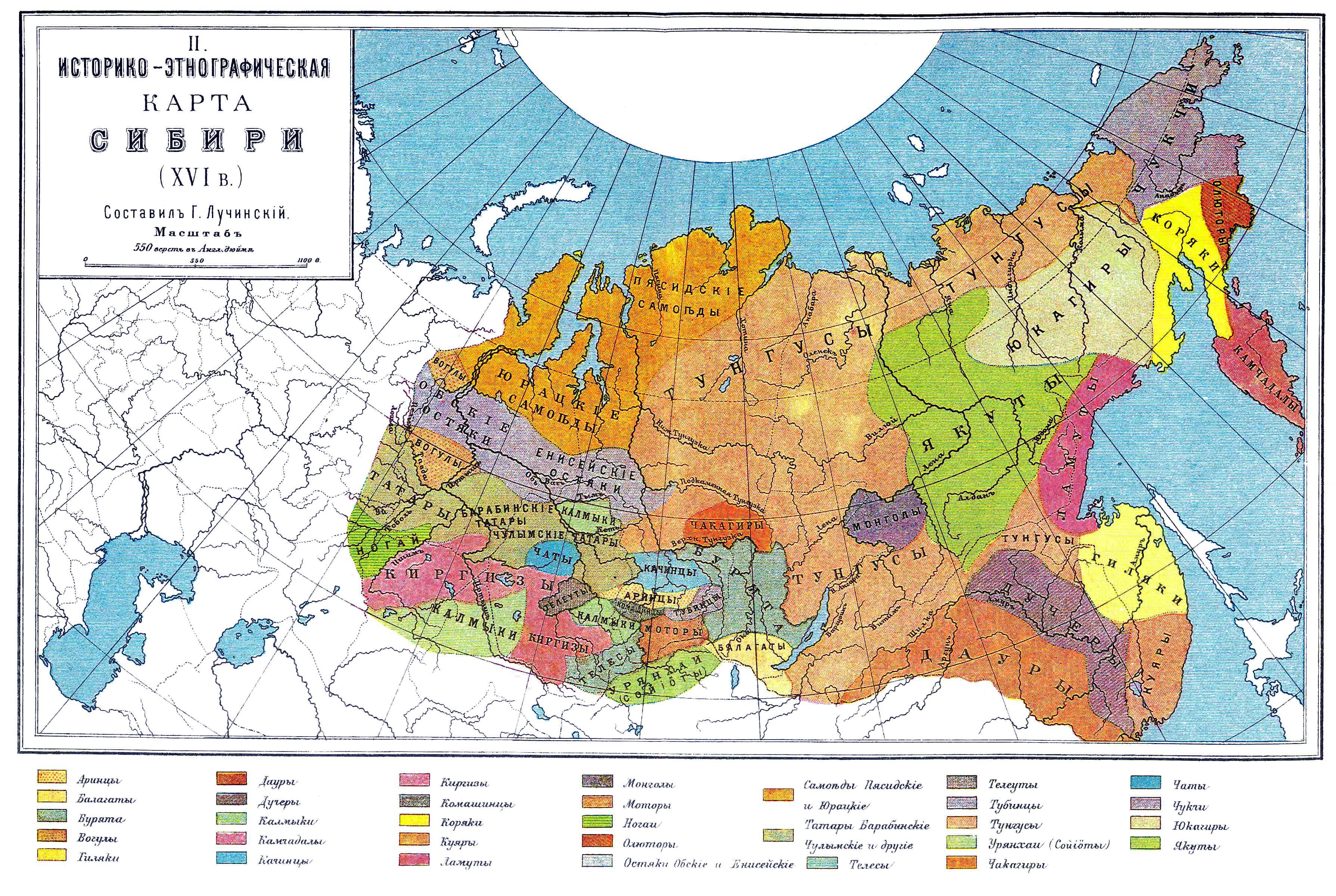
Peoples of Siberia in the 16th century.

== Groups ==
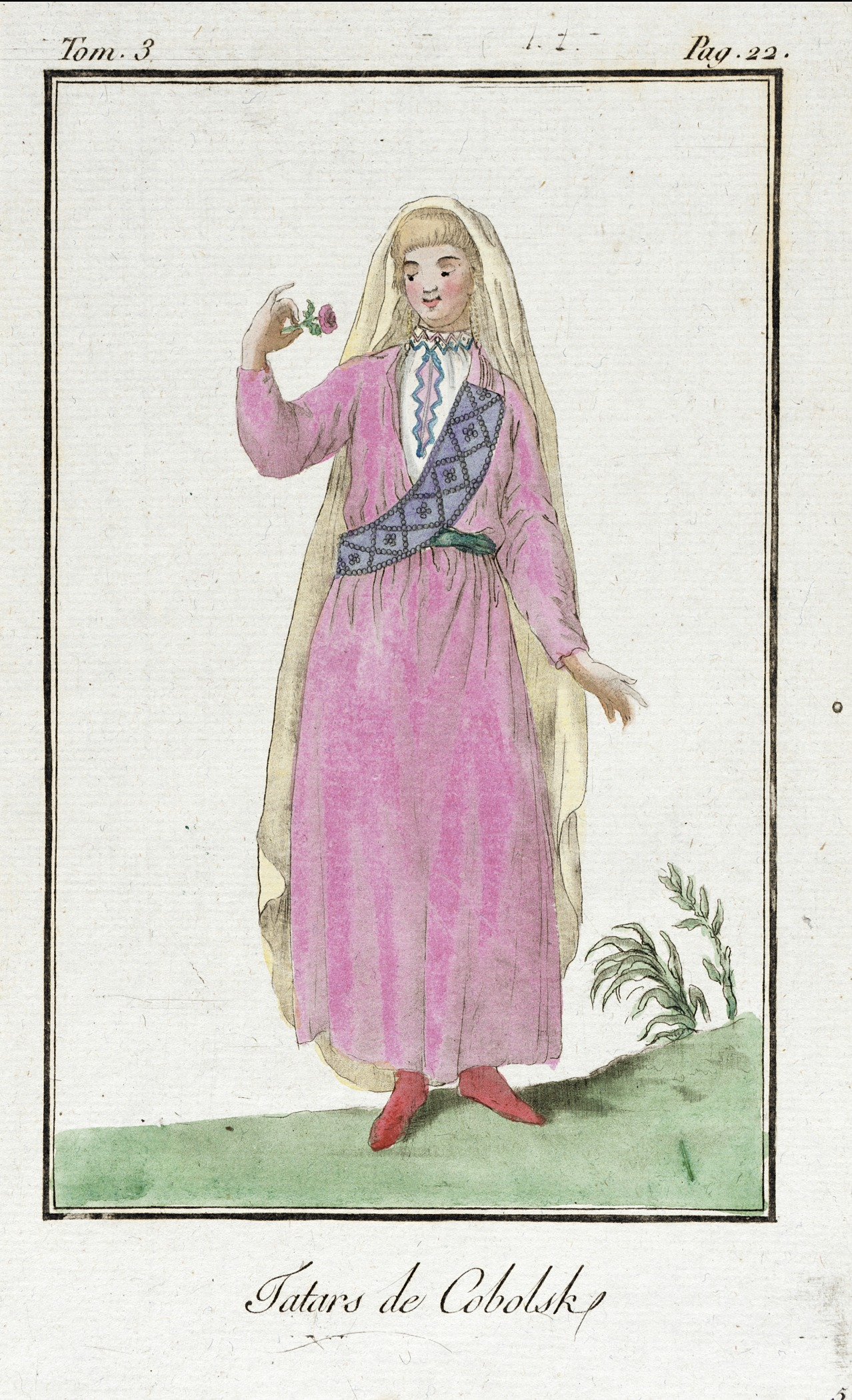
A Tobol Tatar

They are divided into four local sub-groups:

- Aremzyan-Nadtsin Tatars. They assimilated local Khanty and Mansi tribes, and have possible ties with Teleuts. In the 17th century it included Tatar volosts, located along the Irtysh river north of Tobolsk up to the Turtas river. They are the most northern subgroup.
- Isker-Tobol Tatars. The group is located south of Tobolsk. The group is Yurtovsk Tatars, who were in military service. They are central subgroup, geographically speaking.
- Babasan Tatars. They inhabit part of the Tobol basin from the lower reaches of the Tavda to the Mirimov yurts, inhabited by Siberian Bukharans. The term comes from the name of the Babasan volosts, which were recorded from the end of the 16th century until the October Revolution. The Babasan Tatars lack Siberian Bukharan and Kazan Tatar admixture.
- Ishtyak-Tokuz Tatars. The group is named after two tribal groups of the Vagay river basin and Uvat swamps. They are the most eastern subgroup. Among them, the layer of southern Ugrians is more prominent, as well as their intermixing with the Isker-Tobol and Kurdak-Sargat Tatars.

They are the most numerous group of Tobol-Irtysh Tatars and speak the Tobol variant of the Tobol-Irtysh dialect of the Siberian Tatar language, with Eastern Tobol (Tokuz-Uvat Tatar) subdialect of Ishtyak-Tokuz Tatars.

== Genetics ==
Distribution of major Y-DNA haplogroups:

- Isker-Tobol Tatars: R1a-Z93, Q-M242, N1c-LLY22g, N1c2b, H, R2, G2, J2, L.
- Ishtyak-Tokuz Tatars: Q-M242, R1a-Z93, N1c-LLY22g, O1b, I2a1, G2, C, R1b-M73. The prevalence of Q-M242 haplogroup (subclade Q-L330) indicates that Ishtyak-Tokuz Tatars used to inhabit the Baraba steppe.

== Literature ==
- Томилов Н.А. Этническая история тюркоязычного населения Западно-Сибирской равнины конца XVI – начала XX в. – Новосибирск: Изд-во Новосиб. ун-та, 1992. – 271 с.
- Мерзликин В.В. Тобольские татары: проблемы генезиса, семантики и типологии традиционных погребальных сооружений.
