= Kurdak-Sargat Tatars =

Subgroup of Tobol-Irtysh Tatars

Regions with significant populations
- Russia: ~ 10,000
- Omsk Oblast; Tyumen Oblast

Languages
- Tobol-Irtysh dialect of Siberian Tatar, Russian

Religion
- Sunni Islam

Kurdak-Sargat Tatars are a sub-group of Siberian Tatars. They are settled in Omsk oblast, mainly in the Ust-Ishimsky, Tevrizsky, and Znamensky Districts, with also some in eastern part of Vagaysky district in Tyumen oblast. Their historical administrative center was the town of Qyzyl-Tura.

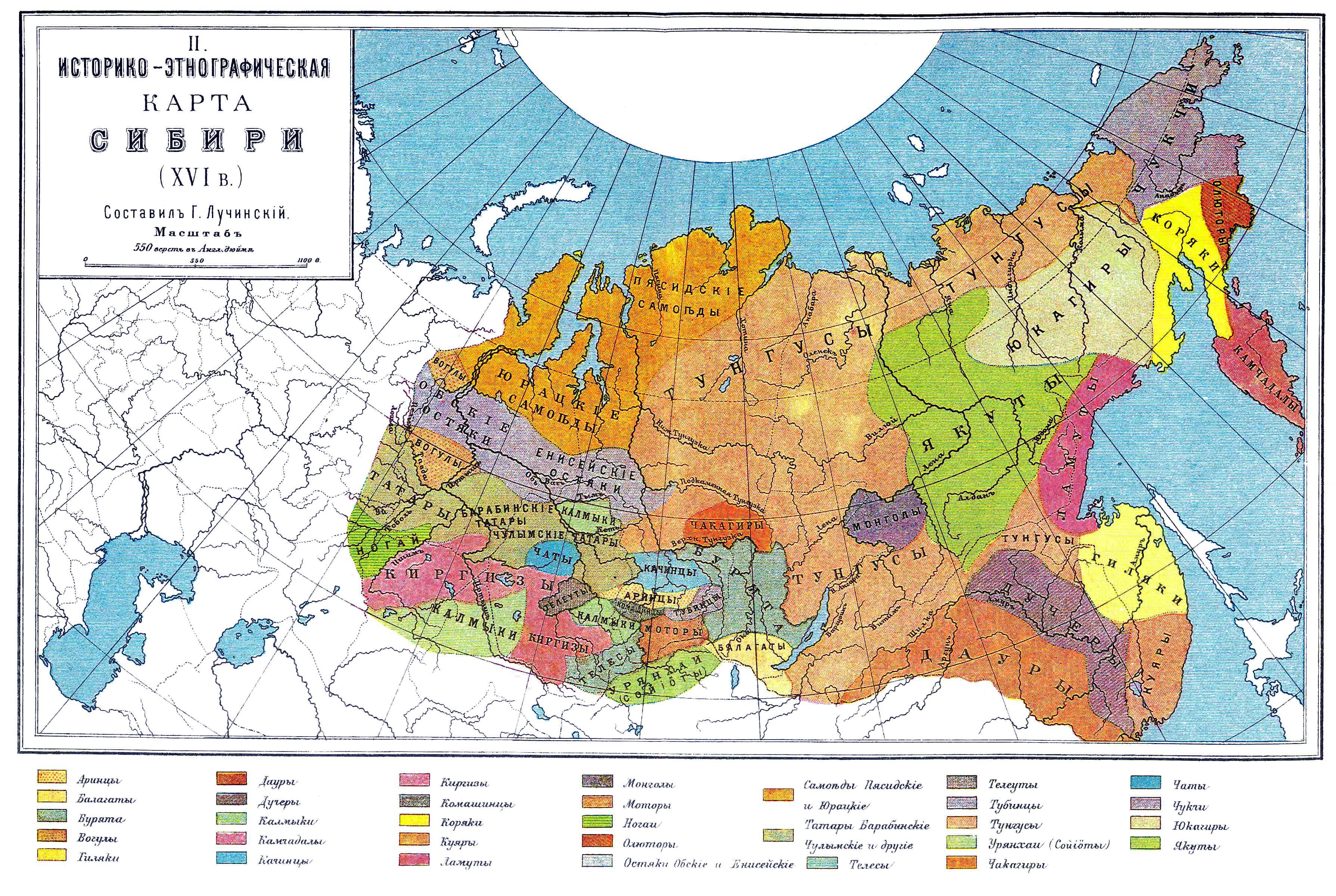
Peoples of Siberia in the 16th century.

They speak Tevriz, a variant of the Tobol-Irtysh dialect of the Siberian Tatar language.

== Origin and ethnogenesis ==
Kurdak-Sargat Tatars are descended from the earliest Turkic settlers in the area, southern Khanty, as well as Noghay and Tobol Tatar elements (the latter date from 1580's). One characteristic is a lack of intermixing with Bukharans. If intermixing with Bukharans was present, it was with earlier Uzbeks. Kurdak Tatars have a Kipchak layer in their ethnogenesis, as is withnessed with the ethnonym Qaraqipchaq.

Sargat-Utuz Tatars are descended of the Khitans, an originally Mongolic group that later became Turkicized. They are also the descendants of the “Otuz Tatars” of the Orkhon Inscriptions.

Immigrant Volga-Ural Tatars settled among the Kurdak-Sargat Tatars in the later periods, in the late 19th and early 20th centuries.

According to N. F. Katanov, who studied the legends of Siberian Tatars, noted that the army of Kuchum Khan was divided into four wings: Kordak (Kurdak), Turaly, Ayaly, and Baraba.

== Groups ==
They are divided into two local sub-groups:

- Kurdak Tatars
- Sargat-Utuz Tatars.

== Literature ==
- Томилов Н.А. Этническая история тюркоязычного населения Западно-Сибирской равнины конца XVI – начала XX в. – Новосибирск: Изд-во Новосиб. ун-та, 1992. – 271 с.
