= Baraba Tatars =

Sub-group of Siberian Tatars

бараба, параба, бараба татарлар, барама baraba, paraba, baraba tatarlar, barama

Regions with significant populations
- Russia: 8,380: Novosibirsk Oblast: 7000–8000; Omsk Oblast: 300–1000

Languages
- Baraba dialect of Siberian Tatar, Russian

Religion
- Sunni Islam

Related ethnic groups
- other Siberian Tatars, Tuvans, Telengits, Teleuts, Chelkans, Chulyms, Shors, Khakas, Altais, Kets, Selkups

The Baraba Tatars or Paraba Tatars (Siberian Tatar: бараба, параба, бараба татарлар, барама, romanized: baraba, paraba, baraba tatarlar, barama) are a sub-group of Siberian Tatars and the indigenous people of the Ob-Irtysh interfluve. After a strenuous resistance to Russian conquest and much suffering at a later period from Kyrgyz and Oirat raids, they now live by agriculture—either in separate villages or along with Russians. Some of them still speak the Baraba dialect of Siberian Tatar. They traditionally live on the Baraba Steppe. Their historical administrative center was the town of Ton-Tura.

== Groups ==
Baraba Tatars are divided into three sub-groups:

- Lyubey-Tunus Tatars. They inhabit northwestern parts of Baraba Tatar territory.
- Baraba-Turazh Tatars. They inhabit central parts of Baraba Tatar territory and are the most numerous Baraba Tatar group.
- Terenin-Choy Tatars. They inhabit eastern parts of Baraba Tatar territory.

== Population ==
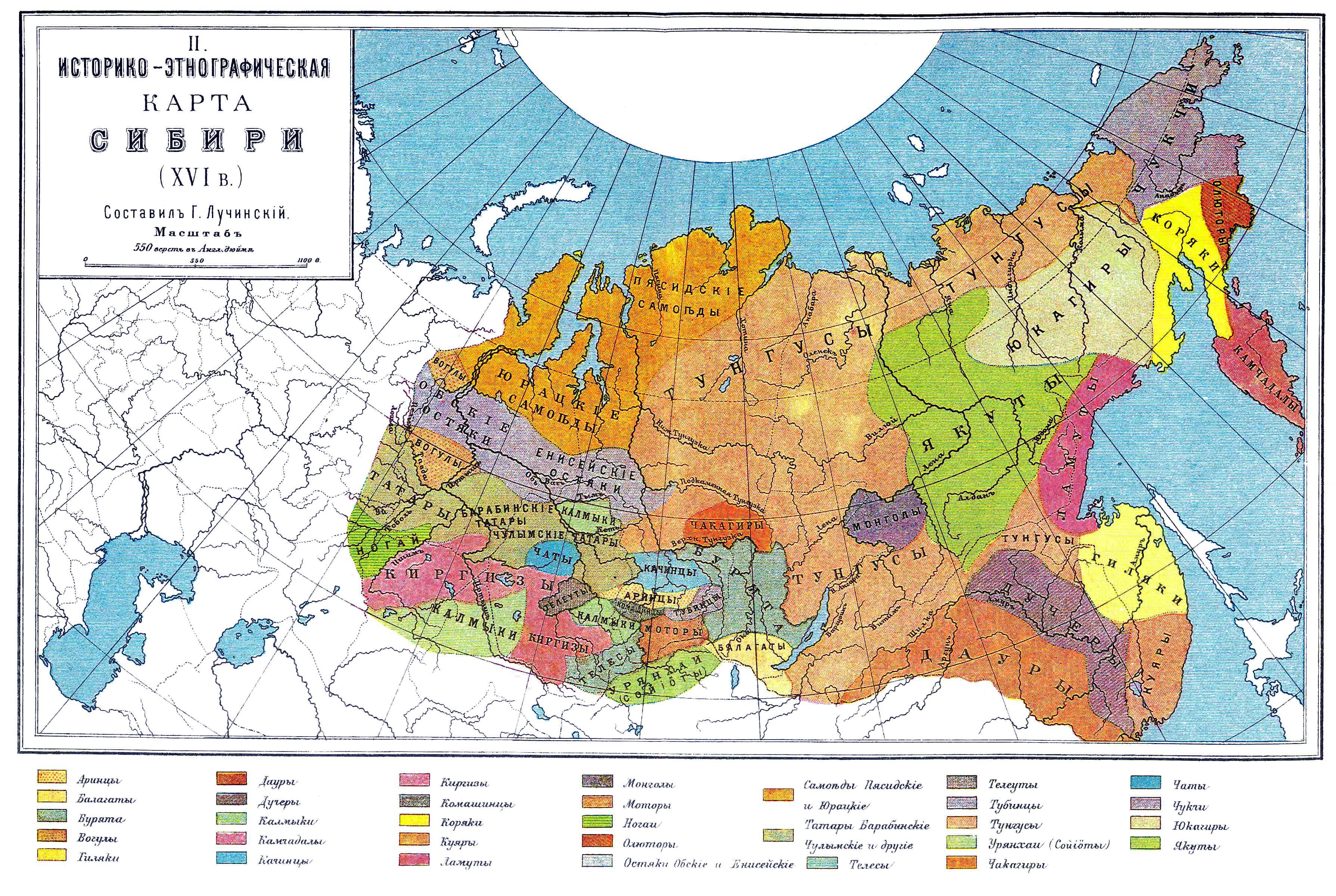
Peoples of Siberia in the 16th century.

They were first mentioned as a separate ethnic group in the Russian Empire Census in 1897 and First All-Union Census of the Soviet Union in 1926. According to 1897 Census their population was 4,433. In 1926 there were 7,528 Baraba Tatars.

Ethnographers estimated that their population reached 8,380 in 1971.

According to the data of the Institute of Philology of the Siberian Branch of the RAS, there were 8,000 Baraba Tatars in Novosibirsk oblast in 2012.

== History ==
The Baraba Tatars are descended from Kipchak tribes who inhabited the region during the 12th and 13th centuries. The region was conquered by the Mongols in the 13th century and was incorporated into the White Horde. The Baraba Tatars lived in the eastern portion of the Khanate of Sibir when it was established in the 15th century.

The Russians subjugated the Baraba Tatars in the 18th century. During the 19th century, the autonomy of the Baraba Tatars eroded away due to the influx of Russian settlers to the region and the high taxes imposed on them by the Russian state. The Russian settlers pushed out the Baraba from more fertile lands. In 1722, a rebellion arose among the Baraba Tatars after Peter the Great issued a decree that mandated all subjects must pledge allegiance to the tsar. The Russians quelled the conflict and severely punished the Baraba. In the reign of Elizabeth of Russia, she began a campaign to forcefully convert the Tatars (including the Baraba) to Christianity; punishments included imprisonment or beating if the Tatars refused to convert.

The Dzungar Khanate extracted yasaq (tribute) from their Baraba Tatar underlings. Becoming Russian subjects was a tactic by the Baraba Tatars to find an excuse not to pay yasaq to the Dzungars. Since Muslim Siberian Bukharans had legal advantages and privileges under Russia, Baraba Tatars pretended to be them.

According to N. F. Katanov, who studied the legends of Siberian Tatars, noted that the army of Kuchum Khan was divided into four wings: Kordak, Turaly, Ayaly, and Baraba.

== Culture ==
The Baraba Tatars are Sunni Muslims. They adopted Islam at around the latter half of the 18th century. However, the Baraba Tatars may have been exposed to Islam as early as the late 16th century and some may have been Muslim by the early 17th century. The form of Islam practiced by the Baraba is significantly influenced by shamanism and residual beliefs in nature spirits and deities.

Baraba Tatars have traditionally engaged in hunting, fishing, agriculture, and breeding some cattle and horses.

== Genetics ==
The most common Y-DNA haplogroup among Baraba Tatars is the haplogroup Q (around 50%), specifically the Q-YP4000 and Q-L330 subclades. Among northern Baraba Tatars, the most widespread is haplogroup N1b-P43, specifically the N-VL67 subclade. Other, less common haplogroups are R1a1-Z93 and R1b-M73.
