= Tara Tatars =

Subgroup of Tobol-Irtysh Tatars

Regions with significant populations
- Russia: ~ 10,000
- Omsk Oblast

Languages
- Tobol-Irtysh dialect of Siberian Tatar, Russian

Religion
- Sunni Islam

Tara Tatars are a sub-group of Siberian Tatars. They are settled in Bolsherechensky, Muromtsevsky, Tarsky, and Kolosovsky districts of Omsk oblast.

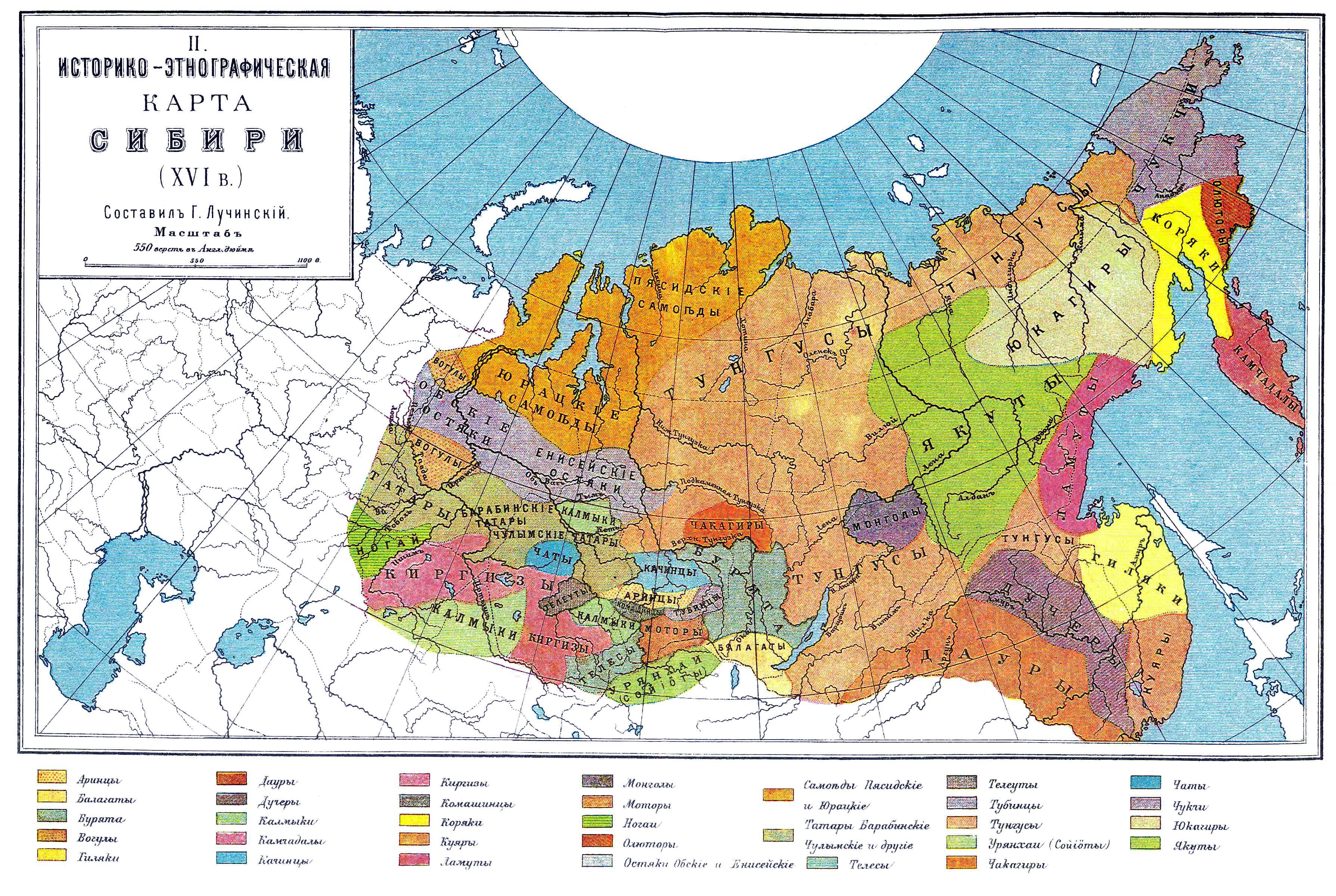
Peoples of Siberia in the 16th century.

They are divided into two local sub-groups:

- Ayaly Tatars
- Turaly Tatars.

They speak Tara, a variant of the Tobol-Irtysh dialect of the Siberian Tatar language.

== History ==
According to N. F. Katanov, who studied the legends of Siberian Tatars, noted that the army of Kuchum Khan was divided into four wings: Kordak, Turaly, Ayaly, and Baraba.

== Literature ==
- Томилов Н.А. Этническая история тюркоязычного населения Западно-Сибирской равнины конца XVI – начала XX в. – Новосибирск: Изд-во Новосиб. ун-та, 1992. – 271 с.
