= Tyumen-Tura Tatars =

Subgroup of Tobol-Irtysh Tatars

Regions with significant populations
- Tyumen Oblast

Languages
- Tobol-Irtysh dialect of Siberian Tatar, Russian

Religion
- Sunni Islam

Tyumen-Tura Tatars are a sub-group of Siberian Tatars in Tyumen oblast. Their historical administrative center was the town of Chimgi-Tura.

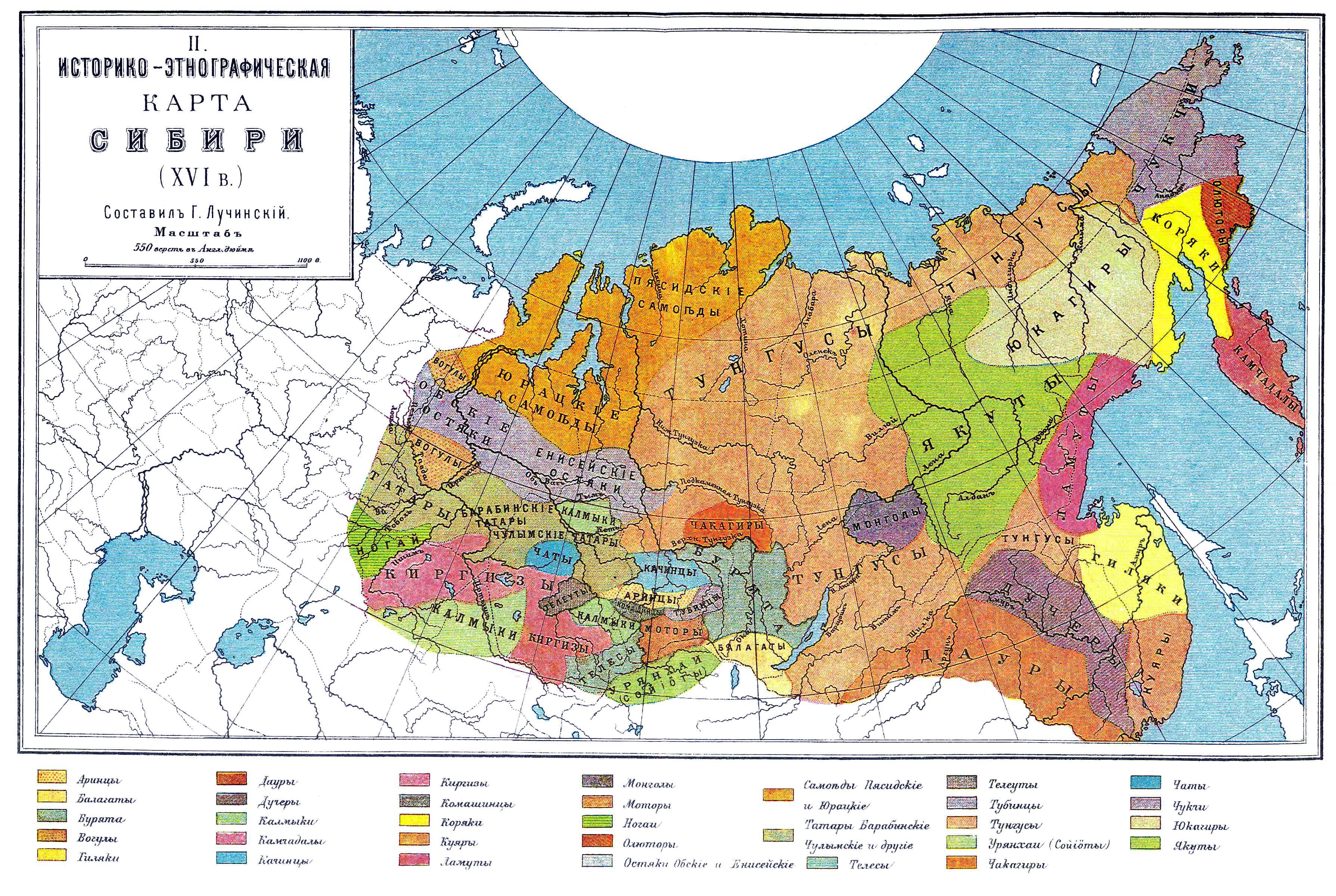
Peoples of Siberia in the 16th century.

They are divided into four local sub-groups:

- Tyumen Tatars live in the lower reaches of the Tura and along its tributaries: Nitsa, Tobol, and partly in the basins of the Pyshma and Iset rivers.
- Tura Tatars inhabit mainly middle and upper reaches of the Tura river and its tributaries.
- Upper Tura Tatars.
- Yalutor Tatars.

The Tyumen-Tura Tatars speak Tyumen, a variant of the Tobol-Irtysh dialect of the Siberian Tatar language.

== Literature ==
- Томилов Н.А. Этническая история тюркоязычного населения Западно-Сибирской равнины конца XVI – начала XX в. – Новосибирск: Изд-во Новосиб. ун-та, 1992. – 271 с.
