= Siberian Bukharans =

Ethnographic and sociocultural group of Russia

The Siberian Bukharans (self-designation: Poğarlı) are an ethnographic and sociocultural group in Siberia. They constituted a significant part of the Tobol-Irtysh (Tyumen-Tura, Tobol and Tara subgroups) and Tom groups of Siberian Tatars.

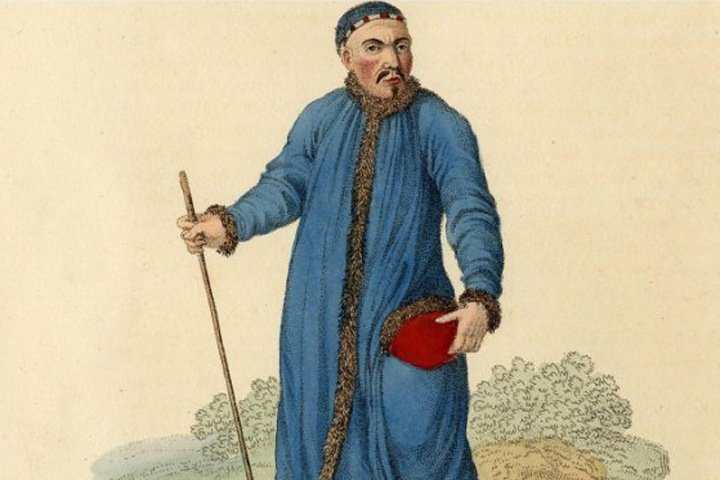
Siberian Bukharans

== History ==
The legend has it that their ancestors came from the Khanate of Bukhara, but genetic studies indicate that they came from the western Caucasus. They were merchants and started to settle in the area in the 17th century after the start of the Russian conquest of Siberia in the 1580s. However, some settled in the area as early as the 15th and 16th centuries.

Their name as an ethnic group — Bukharan appeared in documents until the early 1930s. Now that name refers to people from the city of Bukhara.

Russians formerly used the term "Bukharan" to refer to any caravan merchant from Central Asia, since the Russians did not always have a clear understanding of the geography and peoples further south.

Since Muslim Siberian Bukharans had legal advantages and privileges under Russia, Baraba Tatars pretended to be them.

== Culture ==
Due to the Bukharans frequently intermarrying with the Siberian Tatars, many eventually assimilated with the Tatars and adopted the Tatar language. Most are now listed with the Tatars in recent censuses. However, some are still aware of their Bukharan origins. The Siberian Bukharans are Sunni Muslims.

== Population ==
The Siberian Bukharans maintained their own identity and were quite numerous. They numbered 23,700 in 1926. Their main bases of settlement were Tobolsk, Tara and Tyumen.

In the Tobolsk Governorate there were several Bukharan towns in different uyezds. In Tarsk uyezd of the Tobolsk Governorate Bukharan Town (Russian: Бухарская волость), where the population was primarily Bukharans, existed until the early 20th century.

In Tyumen there is a raion that is officially named Bukharan Settlement (Russian: Бухарская слобода). There are some settlements in the Omsk Oblast which were founded by Bukharans.
