= Siberian Tatar =

Siberian Tatar may refer to:

- Siberian Tatars, an ethnic group
- Siberian Tatar language, a language of the Siberian Tatars
