= Noska =

Physical characteristics
- Mouth: Borovaya
  - coordinates: 58.8548°N 68.6337°E
- Length: 374 km (232 mi)
- Basin size: 8,560 km^{2} (3,310 sq mi)

Basin features
- Progression: Borovaya→ Irtysh→ Ob→ Kara Sea

The Noska (Russian: Носка, Siberian Tatar: Наскы, Nasky) is a river in Tyumen Oblast, Russia. It flows into the Borovaya, a branch of the Irtysh. It is 149 kilometres (93 mi) long, and has a drainage basin of 8,560 square kilometres (3,310 sq mi).
