= Vasily Dmitriyevich Smirnov =

Russian orientalist

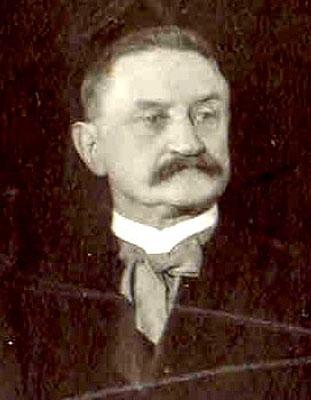
Vasily Dmitriyevich Smirnov

Vasily Dmitriyevich Smirnov (Russian: Васи́лий Дми́триевич Смирно́в; July 28 O.S./August 9 N.S., 1846, in Biryuchya Kosa, Astrakhan Governorate – May 25, 1922, in Petrograd) was a Russian orientalist, specializing in the history and literature of the Ottoman Empire.
