= Biryuchya Kosa =

Biryuchya Kosa Бирючья Коса
- Selo
- Location within Astrakhan Oblast Location within Russia
- Coordinates: 45°43′N 47°35′E
- Country: Russia
- Region: Astrakhan Oblast
- District: Limansky District
- Time zone: UTC+4:00

Biryuchya Kosa (Russian: Бирючья Коса) is a rural locality (a selo) and the administrative center of Biryuchekosinsky Selsoviet, Limansky District, Astrakhan Oblast, Russia. The population was 945 as of 2010. There are 8 streets.

== Geography ==
Biryuchya Kosa is located 41 km southeast of Liman (the district's administrative centre) by road. Zaburunnoye is the nearest rural locality.
