= Baraba Tatar dialect =

Dialect of Siberian Tatar

Baraba Tatar
- Paraba Tatar
- бараба, параба baraba, paraba
- Native to: Russia
- Region: Siberia, Baraba steppe (Novosibirsk and Omsk Oblasts)
- Ethnicity: Baraba Tatars
- Native speakers: <8,000 (2005)
- Language family: Turkic: Kipchak; Kypchak-Kyrgyz; Siberian Tatar; Baraba Tatar

Language codes
- ISO 639-3: –
- Glottolog: bara1273
- ELP: Baraba Tatar
- Baraba Tatar is classified as Severely Endangered by the UNESCO Atlas of the World's Languages in Danger.

Baraba Tatar or Paraba Tatar is a dialect of Siberian Tatar spoken by Baraba Tatars in Siberia. While middle aged individuals and the young generation speak Russian and Volga-Ural Tatar, the Baraba dialect is used only by the older generation. As such, it is classified as Severely Endangered by the Atlas of the World's Languages in Danger.

== History ==
The Arabic script has been historically used to write Siberian Tatar. The Latin script was adopted in 1928 but was replaced with the Cyrillic script in 1938. While standard Volga Tatar is widely taught in local schools, Baraba Tatar is not.

== Geographic distribution ==
Baraba Tatar is spoken mainly in the Novosibirsk Oblast and in Omsk Oblast, in Russia, on the Baraba Steppe. Standard Volga–Ural Tatar is taught at local Tatar schools.

== Sounds ==
=== Consonants ===
Consonants of Baraba
		Labial	Dental	Palatal	Velar	Uvular	Glottal
Plosive	Voiceless	p	t		k	q	
Plosive	Voiced	b	d		ɡ		
Affricate			ts	tʃ			
Fricative	Voiceless	(f)	s	ʃ	x		h
Fricative	Voiced	(v)	(z)	(ʒ)	ɣ		
Nasal		m	n		ŋ		
Lateral			l				
Trill			r				
Semivowel	Plain			j			
Semivowel	Labial			ɥ	w		

- Sounds in parentheses appear only in loan words.
- The sounds [ts] and [tʃ] appear in free variation. The replacement of /tʃ/ with /ts/ is a feature that distinguishes Baraba from Volga–Ural Tatar.

=== Vowels ===
Vowels of Baraba
	Front		Central			Back	
	unrounded	rounded	unrounded	compressed	rounded	unrounded	rounded
High	i	y				ɯ	u
Mid	e	ø	ë	ø̈	ö		o
Low	æ					ɑ	

== See also ==
- Siberian Tatar language
