= Nikolai Katanov =

Khakass scientist (1862–1922)

Nikolai Fedorovich Katanov
- Khakas: Пора Хызыл оғлы
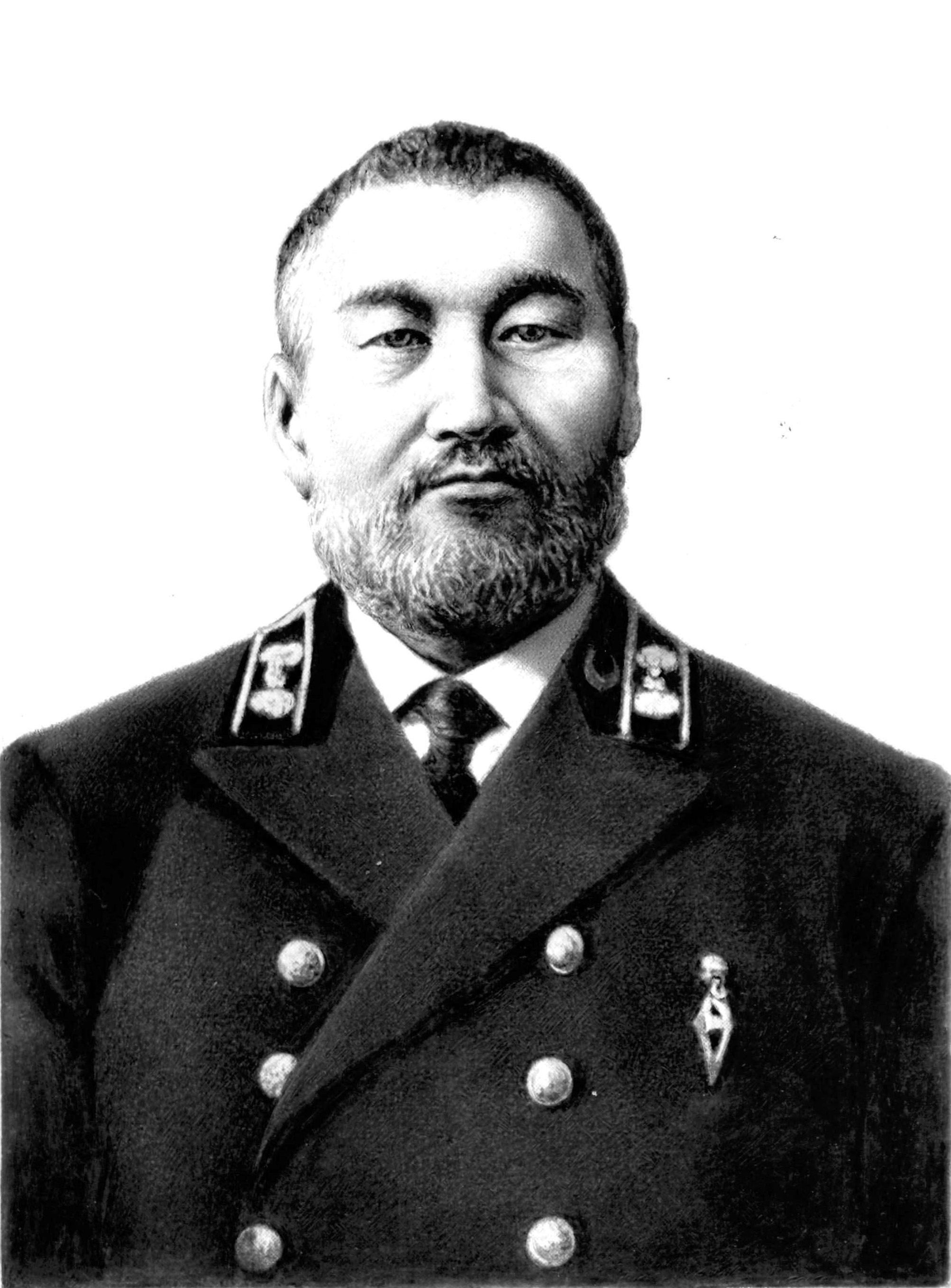
- Born: May 18, 1862; Izyum locality near the village of Askiz, Turakovsky Ulus, Minusinsk district, Yeniseysk Governorate
- Died: March 9, 1922 (aged 59); Kazan, TASSR, RSFSR
- Citizenship: Russian Empire, RSFSR
- Education: Saint Petersburg State University
- Known for: Turkologist, scholar of Central Asian languages and social activist
- Scientific career
- Fields: Philology, Folklore studies, Turkology
- Academic advisors: Vasily Radlov
- Notable students: Sergey Malov, Zeki Velidi Togan

Nikolai Fedorovich Katanov (Khakas: Пора Хызыл оғлы, romanized: Pora Xızıl oğlı; 6 [18] May 1862, Izyum (Uzyum) near the village of Askiz – 9 March 1922, Kazan) was a Russian Turkologist, professor at the Imperial Kazan University and the Kazan Theological Academy, doctor of comparative linguistics, ethnographer, folklorist and social activist. Katanov is widely regarded as the first Khakass scientist and was an Active State Councillor in 1915. He was born into the family of an ulus clerk. From 1876 to 1884, he studied at Krasnoyarsk gymnasium, graduating with a gold medal. He then attended the Faculty of Oriental Languages at St. Petersburg University from 1884 to 1888. On the recommendation of Vasily Radlov, he was sent on an ethnographic-linguistic expedition to Siberia and East Turkestan to study the languages and lifestyles of Turkic tribes. From 1889 to 1892, he studied the peoples of Khakassia, Tuva, Zhetysu, Tarbagatai, and Xinjiang. In 1894, Katanov moved to Kazan after being unsuccessful in securing a place at the University of St. Petersburg. He worked in Kazan for 28 years until his death. In 1903, he defended his master's thesis titled 'The Experience of the Study of the Uriankhai Language'. In 1907, he earned his Doctorate in Comparative Linguistics based on his extensive body of work. From 1911 to 1917, he primarily taught at the Kazan Theological Academy, where he held the position of Ordinary Professor. In 1919, he was elected as a professor at Kazan University through the All-Russian competition, which was approved by Narkompros in 1921.

N.F. Katanov was a member of two foreign societies. The author was a member of several scientific societies, including the Société des sciences et lettres in Leuven, the Ungarische ethnographische Gesellschaft in Budapest, and the Finno-Ugrian Society in Helsingfors. He was also a full member of the Imperial Russian Geographic Society, the Imperial Russian Archaeological Society since 1894, and the Society of Devotees of Natural Science, Anthropology, and Ethnography. Additionally, he was a member of the Turkestan circle of lovers of archeology in the city of Tashkent, and a full member of the Kazan and Semipalatinsk statistical committees. From 1898 to 1914, N.F. Katanov chaired the Society of Archaeology, History and Ethnography at Kazan University. He resumed his position as chairman in 1919. In addition to his academic pursuits, Katanov was actively involved in public life, especially in the field of sobriety propaganda. His scientific works continue to be published and republished in the 21st century.

== Background ==
Nikolai Fyodorovich Katanov was born on May 6 (18), 1862, in Turakovsky ulus, a steppe area located 16 km from the village of Askiz on the left bank of the Abakan River. At birth, he was given the Khakass name Porā, son of Khyzyl (Khakas: Пора Хызыл оғлы, romanized: Pora Xızıl oğlı). His name means "Grey" in Khakass. In his 1897 autobiography for S.A. Vengerov's dictionary, Katanov wrote:

My father was a Tatar (Note: This refers to the Minusinsk or Abakan Tatars, which was the official name of the Khakass people prior to 1917.) of the Sagai tribe and my mother was a Tatar of the Kash tribe of the Pyurut tribe; my father was an ulus scribe of his tribe by profession. Both my parents and I are Orthodox Christians. My parents and all my ancestors practised Christianity, which was introduced to the Abakan valley in the 18th century, and at the same time they openly practised shamanistic rites: they took part in sacrifices to the spirits of the mountains, water, fire and sky and prayed to these spirits as protectors of cattle and people.

The Katanov family belonged to the Khakass seok (clan, literally 'bones') purut (pyuryut), which was part of the Sagai people. According to various sources, Nikolai Fedorovich's mother had the surname Chaptykova or Kizekova, and her name was Maria (Chamakh in Khakas). She belonged to the Khaskha (Kash) seok and Shaloshin clan, meaning she was a Kachintsy (Haas). Katanov's parents adhered to both traditional shamanic beliefs and Orthodoxy, but they were not married in a church. As a result, Nikolai was listed as illegitimate on the metric certificate. Nikolai's elder brother, also named Nikolai (1858–1892), later became a priest at the Ust-Yes church in the Minusinsk district. The family also had a daughter named Maria. As with all Khakas people, the family led a semi-nomadic lifestyle, spending the warm half of the year at a summer camp in the Sagai steppe and the cold season on the bank of the Abakan River near Lake Sarkagel.

The State Archives of Krasnoyarsk Krai contain metric books in fond 824, 'Minusinsk spiritual board', which include a record of Nikolai Katanov's baptism under No. 90. This record confirms his birth date as 6 May old style, with his baptism taking place on 15 (27) May. It was rare for exact dates of birth to be given for the 'Inorodtsy population' during this time. However, according to Alexei Nilogov, an exception was made in this case, as the father of the baptised was an uyezd clerk. The record confirms that Katanov's mother had the surname Kizekova and was Fyodor Semyonovich Katanov's 'illegitimate wife'. In 1876, a note was added to the record stating that a certificate of petition was dated 13 August, likely for admission to the Krasnoyarsk Gymnasium.

== Education (1869-1884) ==
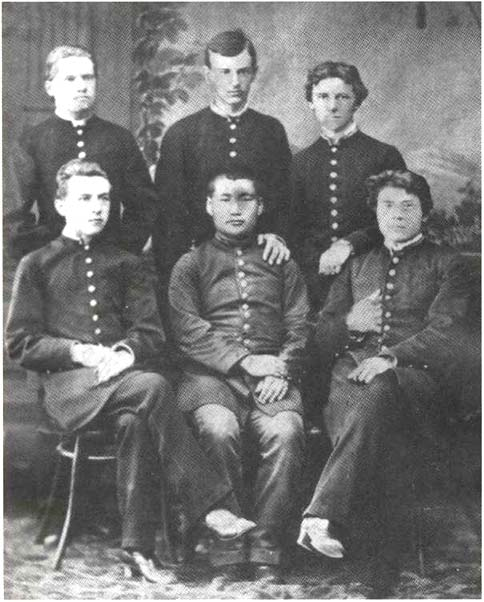
A group of Krasnoyarsk gymnasium students, with Katanov seated in the centre. No later than 1884.

In 1869, Nikolai Katanov enrolled in a one-class rural school that had just opened in Askiz. His uncle, Efim Semyonovich, taught at the school and held various positions such as a letter-writer of the steppe council, church headman, and shopkeeper. The school was not conducive to serious education. However, the Krasnoyarsk goldsmith P.I. Kuznetsov, (Note: P.I. Kuznetsov sponsored V.I. Surikov's education at the Academy of Arts. Innokenty Petrovich Kuznetsov-Krasnoyarsky (1851-1915), his son, was a member of the Society for the Care of Elementary Education and an active supporter of the enlightenment of the poorest classes and indigenous peoples. It was him who Katanov appealed to.) who had a library and aimed to educate the local 'Inorodtsy', kept a house and a transshipment base in Askiz. Nikolai attended the school in Kuznetsov's house and used books for self-education.

Katanov was influenced by I. I. Karatanov, an employee of Kuznetsov, who had a small collection of books on the peoples of Siberia and became his first teacher. Karatanov instilled in Nikolai a deep interest in the culture and history of Turkic peoples. After the death of his father in 1874, Nikolai worked as a shepherd in the summer and came under the care of his uncle, who arranged for him to be a clerk in the Askizsk steppe duma. During his two years of service, Katanov learned Russian literacy and calligraphy. In 1876, Nikolai decided to continue his education and enrolled in the Krasnoyarsk Gymnasium with the help of P.I. Kuznetsov, who was the mayor of Krasnoyarsk at the time. He secured a recommendation from I.I. Karatanov and travelled to the city by boat along the Abakan and Yenisey.

In Krasnoyarsk, Katanov faced severe financial difficulties, which persisted throughout his life. Despite receiving 100 roubles from his father, it was not enough to alleviate his struggles. Although he was the top student for all 8 years of his studies, Katanov had to work as a tutor and sometimes as a summer labourer for more successful friends' families. Among his tutoring charges were the children of merchants - Arseny Yarilov and Vera Emelyanova. Katanov, a gymnasium student, was known for his diligence and aptitude for learning, receiving praise in the second, fourth, and seventh grades. Throughout his eight years of study, he never arrived late or violated any disciplinary rules. However, in the eighth grade, he caused alarm by missing a lesson. The principal sent the gymnasium supervisor to Katanov's flat. It turned out the conscientious student decided to skip class at least once in his life.

N.F. Katanov began to develop as a scientist while in the gymnasium. In his contributions to S.A. Vengerov's dictionary materials, he wrote:

Since 1880, i.e. from the IV class of the gymnasium, under the influence of the history and geography teacher A.K. Zavadsky-Krasnopolsky, a full member of the East Siberian branch of the Geographical Society, I have been engaged in writing down Sagai texts and describing the customs of my tribe. K. Zavadsky-Krasnopolsky, a full member of the East Siberian Branch of the Geographical Society, I was engaged in writing Saga texts and describing the customs of my tribe. Thanks to the acquaintance with the works of scientists V.V. Radlov, M.A. Kastren and N.A. Kostrov, I considerably completed my notes and later printed them in several editions.

In 1883, Grigory Potanin published Katanov's article 'Description of the Shaman's Tambourine and Costume' in his book 'Sketches of North-Western Mongolia'. In 1884, Nikolai Fedorovich submitted the manuscript of the Sagai language grammar to the St. Petersburg Academy of Sciences, where it was reviewed by Nikolay Ilminsky. According to modern researchers, including G.I. Iskhakov and G.S. Amirov, this unpublished work already contained the rudiments of a comparative-historical approach to the study of Turkic languages, which is characteristic of Katanov's mature work. However, Ilminsky undeservedly criticised the work, although he did note Katanov's talent as an ethnographer and linguist.

In 1884, Katanov graduated from Krasnoyarsk gymnasium with a gold medal and intended to receive a Turkological education to become a scientist. Initially, he considered entering the Kazan Theological Academy, perhaps under the influence of his priest brother. However, upon arriving in Kazan, Katanov discovered that the teaching of Oriental languages had almost ceased at both the academy and the university. Following the advice of N. I.Ilminsky and V.V. Radlov, who corresponded with the talented 'Inorodets', Nikolai Fyodorovich decided to travel to St. Petersburg.

== Saint Petersburg period (1884-1893) ==
=== Faculty of Oriental Studies ===
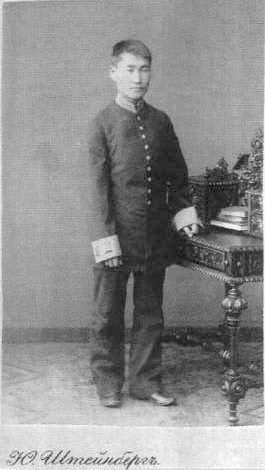
Student of the Oriental Faculty Nikolai Katanov. Photo studio of Y. Shteinberg, no later than 1888.

Katanov enrolled in the division of Arabic-Persian-Turkish-Tatar literature at the University of St. Petersburg on 15 August 1884. He received a comprehensive education, including a broad range of humanities and specialist orientalist disciplines. Having previously mastered French and German at the gymnasium, at the University Katanov studied Arabic, Persian, Ottoman, Tatar, Bashkir, and Kazakh languages, as well as the Chagatai language, history, and literature of Turkic peoples, the history of the East, and Muslim law. Furthermore, Katanov privately studied the phonetics of Turkic languages with V.V. Radlov at home. Radlov had recently moved to St. Petersburg from Kazan and found in Katanov a diligent and attentive student. Katanov was exceptionally accurate and industrious as a student, attending and stenographing all lectures without exception, according to memories. He learned the comparative-historical method for studying Turkic languages from Radlov, which piqued his interest even while in gymnasium.

The same as in the gymnasium, Nikolai Fyodorovich experienced poverty in St. Petersburg. He applied for a state scholarship, which was granted to him in 1885 after a lengthy trial. However, the scholarship was only 8 roubles a month, which made it impossible for him to live a normal life. As a result, Katanov returned to tutoring. According to V.A. Gordlevsky's memories, Katanov wrote memorials for illiterate women on the church porch for 2 kopecks. He lived a very restricted life, only dining on Sundays. Unfortunately, his semi-starvation led to tuberculosis. However, he was able to recover from the disease thanks to expeditions to East Turkestan.

On 5 December 1884, N.F. Katanov was elected as a fellow member of the Society of Archaeology, History, and Ethnography at Kazan University. From 1885, Katanov began to publish actively in Russian and German. His works included studies of the epic of the Minusinsk Turks, collation of materials from M.A. Castren's dictionaries, and a review of Chagatai topographical nomenclature. He also published an article on Russian loanwords in the Sagai dialect.

Katanov became a member of N.M. Yadrintsev's circle in 1886 after meeting him in the 'Society for Assistance to Siberians Studying in St. Petersburg'. They met on Thursdays at Yadrintsev's, where Katanov's interest in the languages and ethnography of Siberia's indigenous inhabitants grew even stronger. Yadrintsev's newspaper Vostochnoe Obozrenie published several articles by Nikolai Fedorovich. The circle was made up of former political exiles and came under police investigation. As a result, Katanov was forced to sign a receipt on 21 August 1887, promising not to join any secret societies or participate in any financial subscriptions or legal social organizations without permission from his superiors during his time at the university. It seems that this was the only instance in Katanov's life when law enforcement agencies took an interest in him. Throughout his life, he was consistently upright and apolitical.

=== Travelling to Siberia and Turkestan ===
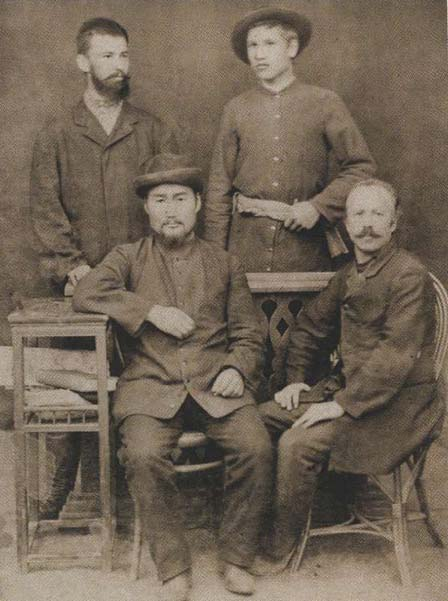
Participants of the expedition to Turkestan: I.F. Tolshin and V.T. Vasilyev are standing, N.F. Katanov and scribe A.P. Bekhterev are sitting. Ürümqi, 1892

Nikolai Katanov completed his course of study in 1888, receiving only one 'good' grade - in Russian history (all of the other marks were 'excellent'). On 30 May, the University Council awarded him the degree of Candidate of Literature. At the same time, I.N. Berezin's proposal was accepted, and Katanov became a professorial fellow of the Eastern Faculty, receiving a stipend of 600 roubles per year for two years.

In 1887, V.V. Radlov submitted a 'Note' to the Russian Geographical Society, justifying the need for an ethnographic-linguistic expedition to study the 'remnants of Turkic tribes' in Siberia and East Turkestan. On 11 December 1887, the Department of Ethnography considered the proposal, and Radlov suggested sending N. Katanov as a 'prepared and capable person'. Radlov petitioned for the allocation of 1000 rubles to Katanov. The Dean of the Faculty of Oriental Studies, V.P. Vasiliev, supported his petition. By Imperial decree of 22 December 1888, candidate N.F. Katanov was sent to Siberia and China for scientific purposes. On 8 December of the same year, the Ministry of Internal Affairs issued Katanov an open sheet, instructing subordinate persons and institutions of the Ministry of Internal Affairs to provide him with all possible support. Nikolai Fyodorovich was also officially listed as an employee of St. Petersburg University.

In early 1889, Katanov left St. Petersburg and returned via Omsk, Tomsk, and Krasnoyarsk, to his native Askiz, where he established the primary base for his field research. On March 7, 1889, he embarked on a journey to Tuva, which he referred to as the Uryankhai land. The trip to Tuva lasted for 5½ months, from March 15 to August 28. The total distance covered during his excursions was approximately 700 versts. N.F. Katanov primarily resided in Russian trading factories, where he interacted with Tuvinians who had direct connections to the Russians. He visited a total of 14 factories, and it was during this time that Katanov's talent as an ethnographer became evident. To avoid arousing suspicion, he posed as an interpreter from a border outpost or a scribe in the merchant's service. He compensated his informants with thread, brick tea, tobacco, paper, pencils, and other small goods. As a result, he collected a substantial amount of field material, including 1122 songs, 160 riddles, 15 fairy tales, and 35 myths. The informants allowed him to record their names and ages, which no previous researcher had been able to do.

After returning to Askiz, Katanov worked on field materials until January 1890. This resulted in two works: 'Sketches of the Uryankhai Land' (published in 2011) and a large manuscript on the grammar of the Tuvan language (published in 1903). According to a letter to V.V. Radlov, Katanov worked at his desk from 8 am to 8-9 pm. The difficulties experienced by the traveller were enormous, and N.I. Veselovsky wrote:

N.F. Katanov undertakes his journey with such meagre material means, with which rarely any of the scholarly travellers, who are generally not spoiled in this respect, undertake journeys to the distant East. All the more do we have to appreciate those interesting materials, which are abundantly supplied to us by the young traveller...

In February and March 1890, Katanov travelled to the Kansk taiga to study the Tofalars. Following this, he began preparing for a trip to China. However, his first trip to Xinjiang was unsuccessful as the Chinese authorities in Ürümqi did not allow him to proceed further without official permission from Beijing. Katanov returned to the Russian border and continued processing field materials in Bakhty. He also requested assistance from the Russian consulates in Tacheng and Yining to rectify the permit. In the summer of 1891, Nikolai Fyodorovich spent time in the border town of Tacheng, studying the folklore of the Kyrgyz and Sart. He finally received a passport in Russian, Chinese, and Manchurian languages at the end of 1891, which allowed him to travel throughout China. Katanov reached Hami via Ürümqi and began studying little-known Turkic dialects in March 1892. He returned to Askiz in April 1892 after spending approximately 18 months in Chinese territory. He also conducted several additional excursions within the Minusinsk district between April and October.

According to K.I. Sultanbaeva, in the published and unpublished materials of Katanov's travels in Siberia and Turkestan, the following lines of research can be distinguished:

1. Language, its various manifestations as spoken by those belonging to Turkic nationalities;
2. Folklore, its genres: fairytales, legends, fables, tales, songs, riddles, proverbs, popular omens, sayings;
3. Religion, philosophical views of the Turkic tribes; attitudes towards Orthodoxy;
4. Material culture, daily life, domestic objects; cult objects;
5. The tribes' socio-cultural, commodity and monetary relations;
6. Social structure of the tribes, governance, their kinship, tribal relations;
7. Elements of the psychology of peoples, of interpersonal and inter-ethnic relations.

=== Return ===
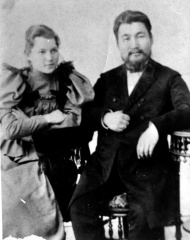
N.F. Katanov and A.I. Tikhonova

On 14 October 1892, N.F. Katanov married Alexandra Ivanovna Tikhonova (1875–1942) at the Peter and Paul Church in Askiz. Alexandra was the adopted daughter of his uncle, Efim Semyonovich. Although the church books in Askiz have not been preserved, a written act called a 'marriage search' was conducted to establish the absence of obstacles to the marriage, such as closely related marriages. This document includes metric and biographical information about the bridegroom. Marriage searches are usually less well-preserved than other such documents. The wedding was attended by a large number of guests, including Innokenty and Ivan, the two sons of goldsmith Pyotr Ivanovich Kuznetsov, who were friends and supporters of the young Katanov. Also in attendance was N.M. Martyanov, the director of the Minusinsk Museum. Alexandra Ivanovna, who graduated from the Minusinsk gymnasium and had a talent for music, played the piano. For 30 years, she assisted her husband with translations and extracts. The couple had a daughter named Anna (1901–1980), who later became a teacher. Katanov also raised his sister Maria's son, Nikolai Gavrilovich Tyunesteev, and gave him his surname. Nikolai Katanov was arrested and executed in 1938.

After completing the programme outlined by the Academy of Sciences and the Russian Geographical Society, N.F. Katanov and his wife returned to St. Petersburg on December 22, 1892. He brought with him several volumes of diaries prepared for printing, as well as a vast amount of data on which he later based all of his scientific works. Numerous materials were initially introduced into scientific circulation, including dictionaries and grammars of the Tuvan and Tofalar languages. Katanov was a pioneer in studying the Uyghur dialects of the Turfan and Khami oases. However, the majority of his linguistic and ethnographic materials remain unpublished, even as of 2017.

Upon returning to St. Petersburg, Katanov had hoped to secure a position as a lecturer of the Tatar language at the Faculty of Oriental Studies. However, he discovered that the position had already been given to a relative of I.N. Berezin. In his letters to V.V. Radlov, Katanov frequently expressed his dissatisfaction with his financial situation, having been forced to sell his travelling coats and a gold gymnasium medal. (Note: In a letter dated 9 January 1893, Katanov reported to Radlov that he had rented a room for himself and his wife for 32 rubles a month, while the police had been unable to issue him with a passport and a residence permit in the capital.) P.O. Rykin states that Katanov briefly lost interest in scientific and teaching activities. This led him to request the Ministry of Public Education to appoint him as an inspector of schools in Orenburg province, Siberia, or the Turkestan region. After a year of uncertainty, on 9 November 1893, Nikolai Fyodorovich received a position as a lecturer at Kazan University with the rank of professor extraordinaire, with the assistance of V.V. Radlov and V.R. Rosen. To take this position, Katanov passed the examinations for the degree of Master of Turkish-Tatar literature on 10 and 21 December 1893 and promptly left for Kazan.

== Kazan period (1894-1922) ==
=== Creative flourish: social activity (1894-1908) ===
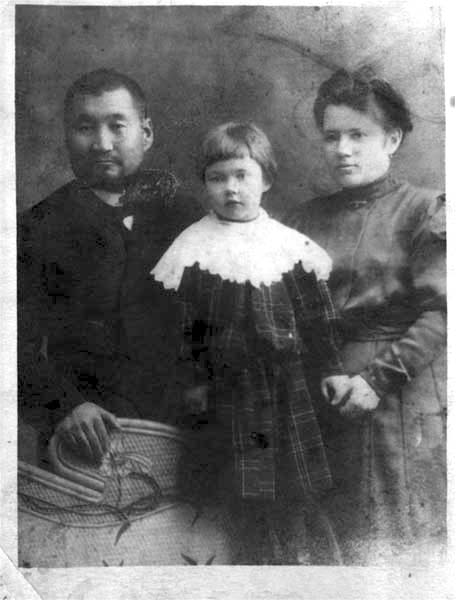
The Katanov family in 1904

On 12 January 1894, the Katanovs arrived in Kazan, where the researcher was to live for 28 years - until his death. At that time, the teaching of Oriental languages at the university had declined, and Nikolai Fyodorovich was to restore this direction of educational and scientific activity. However, as an extraordinary professor, Katanov only taught elective courses. Despite this, his courses quickly gained popularity among students. During the 1894/1895 academic year, N.F. Katanov taught a variety of courses at the Faculty of History and Philology, showcasing his broad and diverse range of interests:

1. The language of the Kazan Tatars (grammar and reading);
2. Review of Turkish-Tatar tribes (history of old and new Turkic states, life of tribes, foreigners' reports about Turks);
3. History of Turkish-Tatar literature (Ottoman, Chagatai, Common Turkic);
4. Comparative grammar of Turkic languages.

During the 1895/1896 academic year, N.F. Katanov expanded his course offerings to include Arabic and Persian languages, as well as the grammar of Altaic languages, Kazakh and Kyrgyz languages. He also taught a special course on 'Inscriptions on the coins of the Golden Horde and tombstones of the Kazan and Bulgar Khanates'.

Nikolai Fedorovich Katanov was elected Secretary of the Society of Archaeology, History and Ethnography - OAIE - at the university less than two months after his arrival in Kazan on 8 April 1894. Katanov was involved in various activities, including organizing the Society's library, editing its Izvestiya, and publishing the Society's reports and meeting minutes for the first time. In 1897, due to the difficulty of balancing his teaching responsibilities with his work for the Society, Katanov requested to be relieved of his duties as secretary. However, in 1898 he was elected as the chairman of the OAIE. On 19 March 1900, he wrote to V.V. Radlov expressing his frustration with the difficult relationships he sometimes had with his colleagues in the Society:

The Council of the Society of Archaeology, History and Ethnography has decided by a majority vote not to print any Oriental texts in Izvestia, because the texts are useless. <...> Moreover, local scientists and quasi-scientists, historians by profession, do not know Islam at all and, to save money, do not follow foreign literature at all, and often not even Russian. <...> In view of the refusal of the Council to print Oriental texts, I resigned the title of chairman and member, but the General Assembly invited me back and yesterday elected me chairman again for the years 1900-1902.

Burdened with a mass of worries at the university and at the OAIE, Katanov took on any work that fell within the scope of his interests. He immediately became involved in the activities of the translation commission of the Brotherhood of St Gury for the translation of the New Testament into the "languages of the Siberian Inorodtsy". From 1907 he became chairman of the translation commission of the Kazan educational district and a member of the committee on press affairs. During this period, Katanov was summoned several times to St. Petersburg for meetings on the education of Inorodtsy. Additionally, he attended meetings of teachers of Inorodtsy schools in Orenburg from 1907 onwards. Katanov was also a member of the council of the Kazan City Museum from 1905 until 1917. During this time, he headed its historical and ethnographic department. He also served as chairman of the museum council from 1906 to 1912 and 1914–1917. The scholar sometimes felt burdened by his numerous duties. In a letter to A.N. Samoilovich, he expressed his dissatisfaction:

I am a permanent expert on the affairs of the Muslim press at the district court, where I get no rest, no time ... and no money. The education authorities are completely powerless to relieve me of my civil duties.

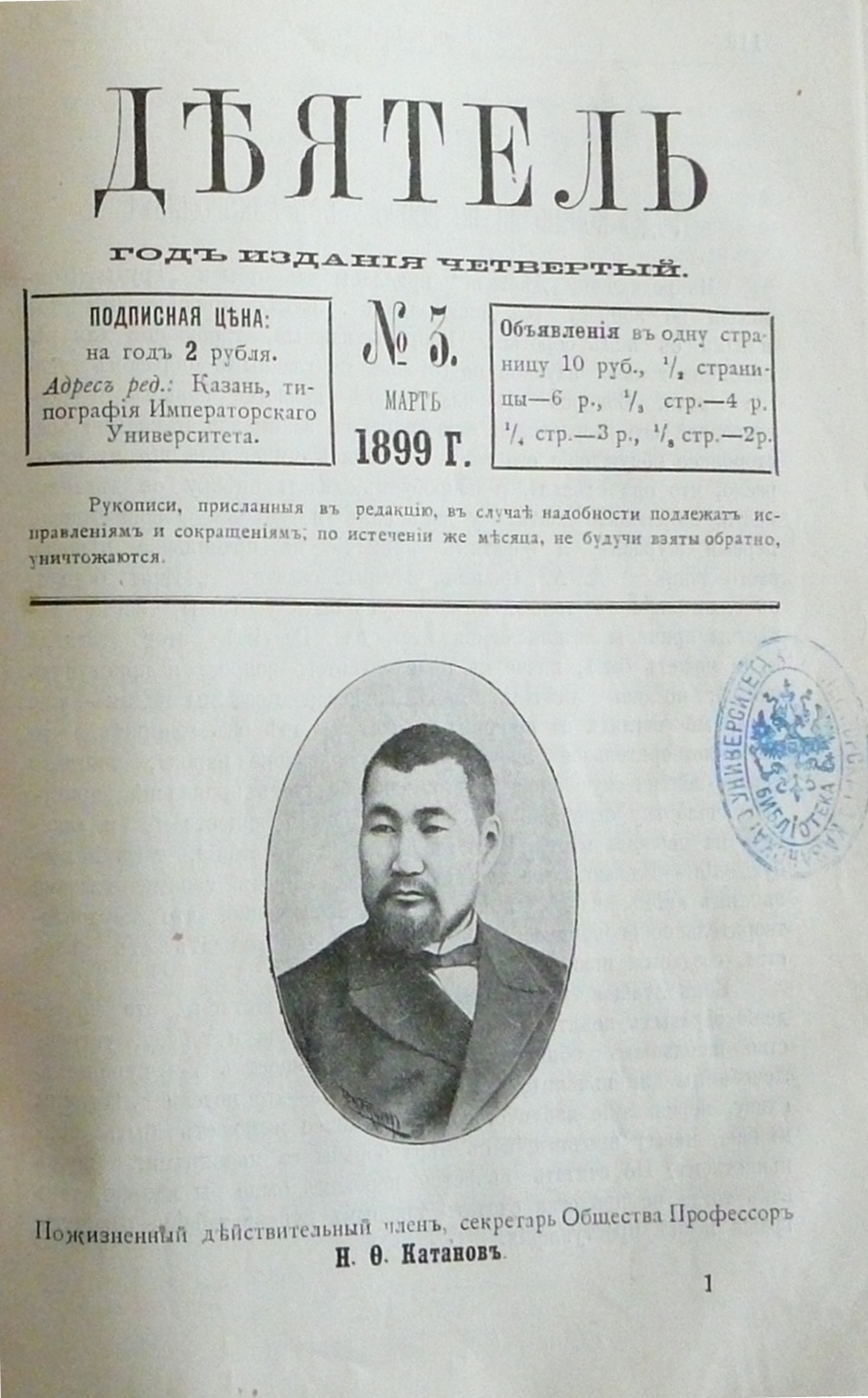
The magazine cover for March 1899 issue of 'Deyatel' featuring a photographic portrait of N.F. Katanov.

N.F. Katanov was an active participant in the temperance movement. He held various positions in the Kazan Society of Sobriety, including member-competitor (since 4 September 1896), full member (since 14 June 1897), honorary member, and life member. He also served as a member of its Committee and secretary. Furthermore, he was the headman of the All-Merciful Saviour church, which was affiliated with the Society. He published works with an anti-alcohol and historical focus in the magazine Deyatel, which he co-edited for a long time. He was the right-hand man of the permanent head of the Society of Sobriety, A.T. Solovyov.

After the Kazan Society of Sobriety was transformed into the Kazan department of the 'Russian Assembly' (KORS), N.F. Katanov joined the activities of this right-monarchical organization. He was elected as the comrade (deputy) of the Chairman of the KORS Council A.T. Solovyov on 4 (17) February 1909, replacing the renowned Russian soil scientist R.V. Rizpolozhensky.

As a critic of socialist theories and new religious doctrines, he frequently denounced their advocates and theorists. This included the well-known Tatar poet Gabdulla Tuqay (Abdulla Tuqayev), who sympathised with the socialist-revolutionaries, and Sardar Vaisov, the founder of the 'Vaisov movement' (which N. F. Katanov classified as a 'Muslim sect').

N.F. Katanov made a significant contribution to the development of the Orthodox mission in the Volga-Kama region. He served as the head of the editorial board of the Inorodcheskoye Obozreniye (a supplement to the journal Pravoslavniy Sobesednik), which was the printed organ of the missionary department of the Kazan Theological Academy. The publication, which began in late 1912, was dedicated to describing the 'modern life' and religion of foreigners in European and Asian Russia.

Despite his heavy workload in education, organization, and social work, Nikolai Fyodorovich still managed to find time for scientific research. Between 1898 and 1908, he published 145 scientific papers, excluding reviews and abstracts. In 1896 and 1899, he conducted expeditions to the Minusinsky district to study the Beltyr and Sagai people. During this time, he observed shamanic kamlanie. From May to August 1897, he conducted field research among the Teptyars and Kryashens. In May–August 1898, he travelled to the Ufa province to study the Bashkirs, Mishar Tatars, and again the Teptyars and Kryashens. Detailed reports were published in Izvestiya OAIE. In February 1909, the scientist was unanimously made an honorary member of the Society of Archaeology, History and Ethnography. In 1900, the scientist visited Belgium and France. In the summer of 1909, Katanov made his final trip to his hometown of Askiz.

By 1904, N.F. Katanov had become a member of the Societe des sciences et lettres in Louven, the Ungarische ethnographische Gesellschaft in Budapest, and the Finno-Ugrian Society in Helsingfors, thanks to publications in French and German.

=== The experience of the Study of the Uryankhai language ===
N.F. Katanov's work, The Experience of the Study of the Uriankhai Language with the Indication of the Main Related Relationships to Other Languages of Turkic Root, is notable for its extensive volume of approximately 600 pages. According to Katanov's biographer S.N. Ivanov, this work was defining for Katanov's career as a Turkicologist. Katanov's dissertation, published in parts between 1899 and 1903 in the Academic Notes of Kazan University, provided the first comprehensive description of the Tuvan language. The Experience has a structure that resembles traditional descriptive grammars of the 19th century. However, it is distinguished by the inclusion of a chrestomathy and a dictionary. The grammar of the Tuvan language demonstrates the author's extensive knowledge, as materials from 5 ancient and 42 modern Turkic languages from Katanov's card catalogues were used to compare 'sounds and forms'. The comparative study served Katanov solely to prove the Turkic origin of the Tuvan language. In contemporary science, ideas about the Samoyedic or Yenisei origin of Tuvinians were prevalent, even in the case of V.V. Radlov and N.M. Yadrintsev. Although the problems raised are important, the work received severe criticism from A.N. Samoilovich. The author was reproached for weak development of Tuvan syntax, to the detriment of morphology, and poor acquaintance with modern linguistics, particularly phonetics. P.O. Rykin states that Katanov showed little interest in theoretical issues. However, he demonstrated mastery of all the necessary terminology and presentation when formulating the research goal.

The Experience of the Study of the Uriankhai Language was submitted by Katanov as a master's thesis for public defence at the Faculty of Oriental Languages of St. Petersburg University on 7 December 1903. The official opponents were V.D. Smirnov and P.M. Melioransky. After the defence, Nikolai Fyodorovich was awarded the degree of Master of Turkish-Tatar literature. On 26 November 1907, the Council of Kazan University granted the Faculty of History and Philology's petition to award N.F. Katanov an honorary Doctor of Comparative Linguistics degree. On 15 December, Nikolai Fyodorovich was confirmed as holding the doctoral rank by the Minister of Public Education.

=== Katanov and the museums of Kazan ===
After relocating to Kazan, N.F. Katanov promptly immersed himself in the management of the university and city museums. His initial focus was on the University Museum of History, where he contributed several Siberian shamanic artefacts to the collection, which are now housed in the university's Museum of Ethnography. Subsequently, he was commissioned by the OAIE to catalogue a collection of Russian copper coins dispatched by the Cheboksary and Tetyush district governors. In 1896, Nikolai Fedorovich published a separate edition describing I.A. Iznoskov's numismatic collection as defined by the Society. He was later drawn to the collection of the Kazan merchant V.I. Zausailov, which by 1907 contained a larger number of Bronze Age objects from the Volga-Kama region than all Russian museums combined. The collection included 5,282 Stone Age artifacts, 1,292 Bronze Age artifacts, 1,417 Iron Age artifacts, and 1,639 pieces of ceramics and glass. In 1897, Katanov took over as the head of the OAIE museum, which had critical collections due to lack of space. The collections were placed in an unsuitable corridor of the former university dormitory. In 1906, N. Katanov played an active role in creating the treasury of the Church Historical and Archaeological Society of the Kazan diocese.

On 26 September 1905, N.F. Katanov was elected to the Council of the City Museum during a meeting of the Kazan City Duma. He headed its historical and ethnographic department from January 1906 to the end of 1917 and held the position of treasurer while also serving as the head of the Museum Council twice (in 1906-1912 and 1914–1917). He continued to pursue his collecting aspirations and began a purposeful collection of Tatar shamail. He acquired many items at his own expense and donated them to the museum's fund. N.F. Katanov organised the historical and ethnographic museum of the Kazan Theological Academy in 1912, drawing on his experience gained at the university and Kazan City Museums. He personally acquired many items and arranged lectures on the history and ethnography of Finno-Ugric and Turkic peoples at the museum. As the museum's funds were located in the library, N. Katanov aimed to transfer the most valuable exhibits to the Kazan City Museum. In 1918, Professor Katanov took charge of the university numismatic cabinet and organized the collections, including those that had not been accessed for decades.

=== Creative decline (1909-1917) ===
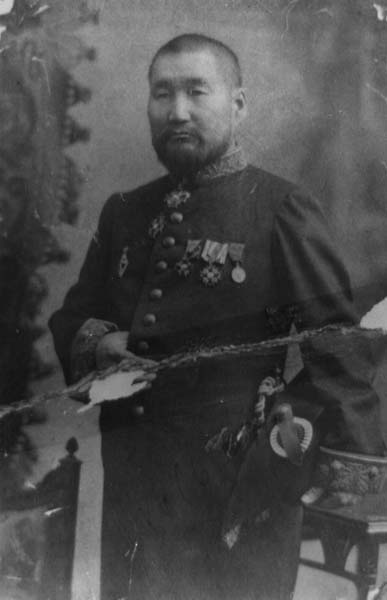
N.F. Katanov in the uniform of a professor of Kazan University with decorations. Photo from 1909

Most biographers of N.F. Katanov have observed a decline in his scientific activity by the end of the first decade of the 20th century. This was due to the unfavourable socio-psychological conditions at Kazan University and the OAIE. According to the memoirs of A. N. Katanova, the daughter of the scientist, in 1894, many university professors were dissatisfied with the appearance of a 'foreigner' in their environment. Some even expressed extreme opinions, such as 'they will soon send savages to us'.

Ivan Barashkov-Epcheley, the first Khakass journalist and public figure, recounts further anecdotal stories in his memoirs. Once Nikolai Fyodorovich and his family were about to board a steamboat to Astrakhan. On the day of departure, he disembarked after settling his wife and daughter in the cabin. At the wharf, a high-ranking official from the Governor-General's office mistook him for a porter and offered him fifty kopeck to carry his suitcases. The scientist did not object. At dinner, N.F. Katanov wore a professor's vizmundir adorned with all his awards. When the official recognized him, he inquired about his rank and title. Katanov then listed a long series of his regalia. The official apologised and requested the return of the fifty kopeck. The reply was, 'Why, Your Excellency, why should I? After all, I earned it through honest labour.' Nikolai Fyodorovich attempted to ignore such incidents, but he could not fully isolate himself from them.

According to his biographer S.N. Ivanov, Katanov's position in Kazan can be described as follows:

The only representative of Oriental Studies at Kazan University, Katanov was deprived of a professional academic sphere, his research interests were alien to the professors surrounding him at the Faculty of History and Philology. A recognised scholar, Katanov was forced to confine himself to reading optional courses, and his position as a "teacher with the rank of extraordinary professor" did not correspond to his scientific weight and authority.

Katanov was compelled to move to Kazan as there was no place for him at the University of St. Petersburg. His resentment towards the events of 1893 persisted throughout his life. In 1904, he candidly wrote to E.K. Pekarsky, 'In St. Petersburg I did not find a shelter thanks to the diligent intrigues of some Orientalists.' His relationship with his colleagues in the capital deteriorated to the extent that N.F. Katanov pledged not to publish anything in St. Petersburg and kept his word. In the end, the scientist found himself isolated from the main centre of Russian orientalism and was indifferent to the West. Nevertheless, in 1907, V.V. Radlov published two volumes of Katanov's materials in the 9th edition of 'Samples of Folk Literature of Turkic Tribes' in St. Petersburg. The volumes contained the original language and Nikolai Fedorovich's translation. The book included 1410 titles of folklore from Tuvinians, 1159 titles from Khakasses, and 203 titles from Karagas.

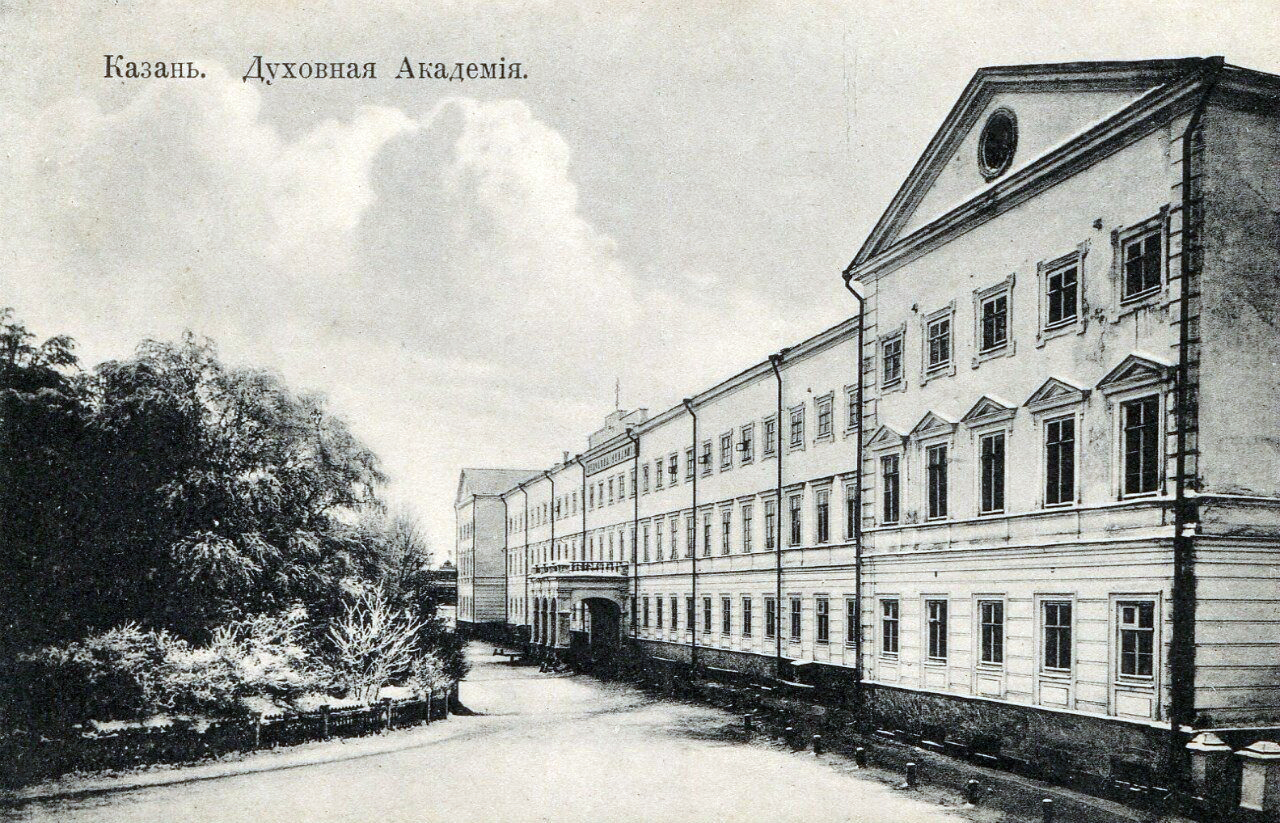
The building of the Theological Academy on Arsk Field. Photo of the 1900s

After 1908, Katanov gradually lost interest in scientific research, believing it to be useless and unnecessary. In 1913, his attempts to establish himself at the university ended with the University Council's refusal to establish permanent residencies at the departments of Turkish-Tatar and Finno-Ugric linguistics. This would have allowed Katanov to have a permanent student body. As a deeply religious man, Nikolai Fyodorovich tried to solve his crisis in church. In 1906, he joined the Church Historical and Archaeological Society of the Kazan diocese, and in 1909, he became a full member of the Tauride Academic Archival Commission. In May 1911, he decided to compete for the vacant chair of ethnography and history at the Kazan Theological Academy. The chair was specially designed for the study of Turkic languages and missionary activity among the Tatars, Chuvash, Mari, Kazakhs, and other peoples. Nikolai Fyodorovich received the majority of votes in the election but faced opposition from the former head, E. Malov. Malov accused Fyodorovich of having an 'objective and indifferent' attitude towards Orthodoxy. On October 7, 1911, the Most Holy Synod cancelled the competition results and approved Malov's protégé, A. Mikhailov, as the new head. However, after his refusal "for family reasons", by synodal decree of 30 November Katanov was still appointed head of the department, but with the rank of associate professor, not professor.

At the Theological Academy N. F. Katanov taught courses on the history of Christianity in the Volga region during the Golden Horde period and the history of Nestorianism in Central Asia and Mongolia from the 5th to the 11th centuries. He also instructed students in the Tatar language. Katanov published a 'Concise Tatar-Russian Dictionary' and a Tatar chrestomathy for students' needs. He also led the academy's museum and edited the Inorodicheskoye Obozrenie. There is the following testimony about Katanov's activities at the academy:

The lessons were given in the form of a lively oral conversation, illustrated with facts and references from personal observations of foreigners and their language - living and dead, new and old, vernacular and bookish.

Despite his merits, Katanov was denied the title of Ordinary Professor of the academy in 1913. He did not receive it until 1915.

Between 1909 and 1916, N.F. Katanov's productivity sharply declined. He only published 11 works during this period, mostly consisting of notes on the Tatar language. Additionally, he neglected his duties at the OAIE, missing meetings and delaying the publication of 'Izvestiya'. He also withdrew from several commissions. The elections held on 19 March 1914 ended in scandal when Nikolai Fyodorovich was accused of embezzling the Society's financial resources and was subsequently voted out of office. Although the accusations were soon revealed to be baseless, Katanov was so offended that he severed all ties with the Society. He later sold his extensive library, which contained 7,325 volumes in 22 languages, to the Turkish Prime Minister Hilmi Pasha for 3,000 gold liras. (Note: According to K. Yavuz, director of the Institute of Turkic Studies at Istanbul University, Katanov sold 3,500 volumes in 1914, and his widow donated the same number to Istanbul in 1922. Among them were bibliographic rarities: "Grammar of the Arabic Language" (London, 1862), "Grammar of the Turkish Language" (London, 1832), "Grammar of the Persian Language" (London, 1783), "History of Persia" (London, 1921) and others. There were also unique manuscripts of the XIII century by Medim (1255), Osman Nurs (1290), Pertev Pazi (1256))

The sale of the library had a significant impact on Nikolai Fyodorovich's mental state. Following the outbreak of World War I, his focus shifted to teaching at the academy and, to a lesser extent, the university. He was in the process of preparing a chrestomathy of Gospel texts 'in various Inorodtsy languages' for third-year students at the Theological Academy. However, this work was interrupted by the revolutionary events of 1917.

=== Life and work in Soviet Russia. Death (1918-1922) ===
According to contemporaries and close associates, N.F. Katanov was far from politics and refrained from publicly announcing his views. The events of 1917 did not affect Katanov directly, but they did lead to an expansion of his professional duties. In October of that year, the North-Eastern Archaeological and Ethnographic Institute was established in Kazan, with a democratic structure that included an elected rector and student participation in management. The teachers were affiliated with the university and classes were held in the evening.

Nikolai Fyodorovich was elected as the dean of the archeological department. He delivered lectures on the history of the Golden Horde, source studies of the Volga region, Oriental numismatics, and Oriental chronology. The Oriental Department was established at the Institute in May 1919, with Katanov as its head. After the institute was transformed into the Oriental Academy in 1921, Katanov continued to work there. It was only after the proclamation of Soviet power that Katanov was able to fully utilise his skills and talents without facing opposition from nationalists and ill-wishers. In addition to teaching at the Archaeological Institute, he also taught at the Higher Institute of Public Education and the Chuvash Pedagogical Courses. Furthermore, he lectured at the Higher Eastern Music School on the topic of 'the songwriting of the Turkish-Tatar peoples'.

On 15 February 1919, N.F. Katanov was elected as a professor at Kazan University through an All-Russian competition. On 1 August 1921, he was officially approved for this title by the People's Commissariat for Education. On 17 January 1919, at the first meeting of the renewed Society of Archaeology, History and Ethnography, Katanov was re-elected as its chairman and also became a member of the council. On 31 January 1919, Nikolai Fyodorovich led the commission for organizing the Oriental Department at the Faculty of History and Philology at the university. Additionally, since 1918, he had been in charge of the numismatic cabinet and successfully retrieved the gold and silver coins confiscated by the Cheka. His teaching load was up to 47 hours a week, which was necessary to provide for his family during the famine years of the Civil War.

S.N. Ivanov notes that after 1918, 'Katanov regained a taste for scientific research.' Despite the challenging conditions of devastation and civil war, he managed to publish a significant amount of material in just three years (1918–1921), equivalent to that of his previous eight years of work. Notably, he produced a 240-page work titled 'Eastern Chronology', which was based on a lecture course at the Archaeological Institute. In 1920–1921, Kazan hosted the 'Exhibition of the Culture of the Peoples of the East'. Katanov was part of the commission responsible for its organization, and he compiled a brief description of oriental coins. One of Katanov's students at the Faculty of History and Philology was Militsa Nechkina, who left evidence of her time with him in her diary and correspondence.

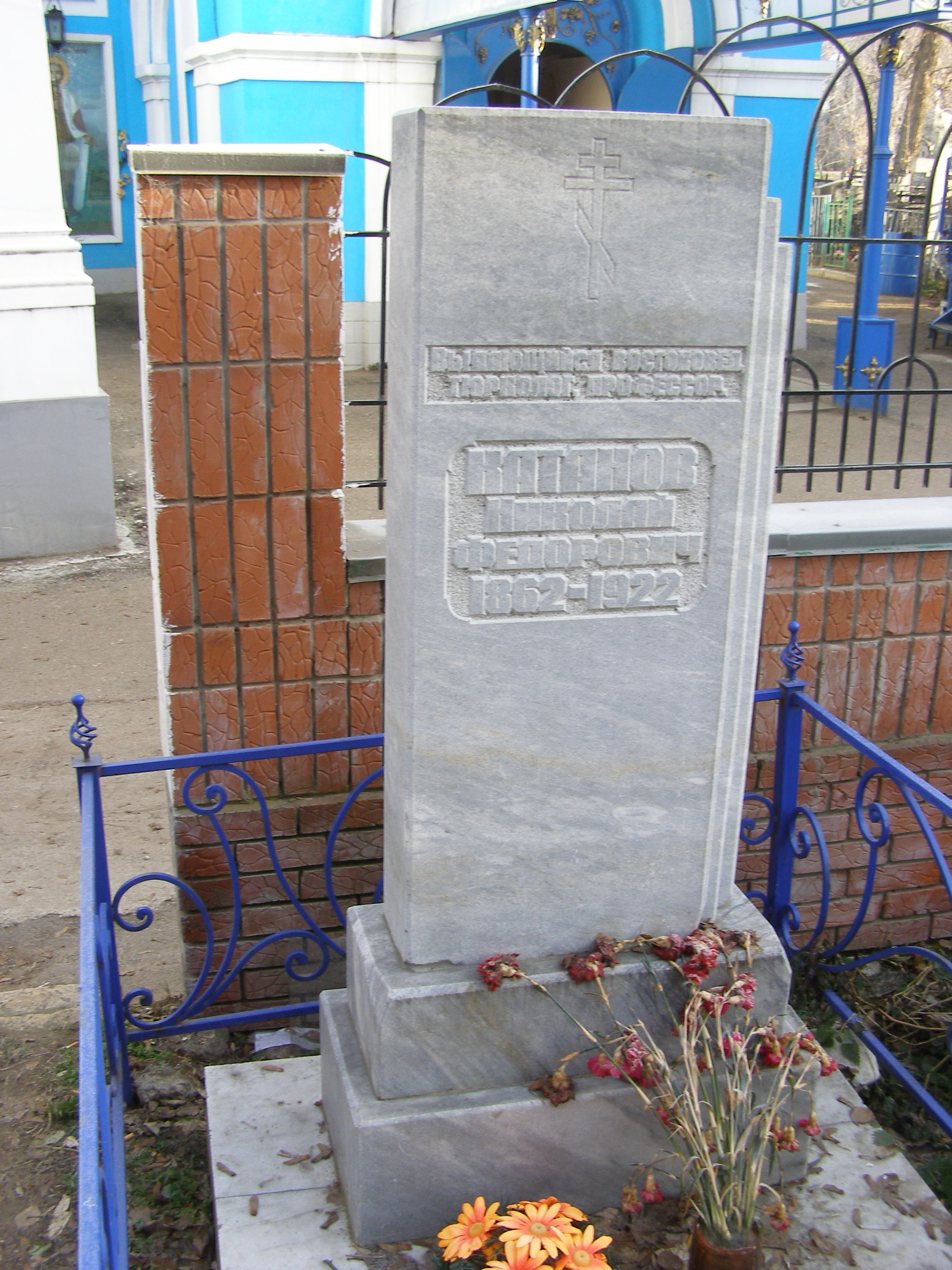
N.F. Katanov's tombstone at the Arskoe cemetery. The entrance to the Church of the Yaroslavl Wonderworkers in the back. 15 November 2014.

Katanov could not avoid the hardships of Soviet life - cutting firewood and standing in queues for hours. Additionally, like many other employees of Kazan institutions, Nikolai Fyodorovich also worked on his vegetable garden. Despite his outward optimism, he began considering a move to a more prosperous location by 1921. He received offers from universities in Baku, Tashkent, Vladivostok, and Krasnoyarsk. During autumn, the scientist's body was unable to withstand the physical strain and hard work anymore, which resulted in Katanov becoming paralysed. By the start of the new year in 1922, he began to recover gradually, but then fell ill with purulent pleurisy. Despite being bedridden, Katanov wrote to the Council of the Saransk Local History Society on 11 February 1922, outlining a comprehensive research programme. In early March, N.F. Katanov's health sharply deteriorated due to tuberculosis. He was transferred to Shamov Hospital and underwent an urgent operation, but it was too late. N.F. Katanov died on the night of March 10, 1922 at the age of 59. (Note: The exact date of Nikolai Katanov's death should be considered 9 March 1922. In the book of the Kazan registry office there is a record No. 335 (State Budgetary Institution "State Archive of the Republic of Tatarstan. F. R-6672. Op. 2. D. 246. L. 86-86ob), which indicates the date of death of Professor Nikolai Katanov - 9 March, and the cause of death: "purulent pleurisy after surgery.")

The death certificate indicates that the scientist was buried in the fence of the Spaso-Preobrazhensky Monastery within the Kazan Kremlin. In 1928, the executive committee of the city permitted the remains to be transferred to the Arskoe cemetery, where they were interred near the grave of N.I. Ilminsky, one of N.F. Katanov's first teachers. There is, however, a version that in the Arskoe cemetery, there is only a cenotaph built for the 110th anniversary of the scientist in 1972, and the actual location of his burial has been lost for some time. In 2023, A. S. Nilogov published an official record on the death of N. F. Katanov (No. 335 of 9 March 1922), which is kept in the State Archive of the Republic of Tatarstan. The record confirms that Professor Katanov died on 9 March and was buried in the Arskoe cemetery. A. S. Nilogov suggests that to determine if the current tombstone is a cenotaph, exhumation, forensic medical examination, and genetic analysis of the direct male line of the Katanov family are necessary.

== Personality ==
=== Character and behavioural style ===
N. F. Katanov's character and behaviour were shaped during his time in gymnasium, and the trials he faced during that period had a lasting impact on his life. According to his contemporaries, Nikolai Fyodorovich was consistently calm, balanced, and patient. As a scientist and teacher, he was known for his pedantry and strictness, which sometimes bordered on rigidity. For all his outward reticence, Katanov, judging by the memoirs of A.A. Yarilov, was 'secretly kind inside, looking for a warm attitude to himself.' He was frugal, meticulously recording even the smallest expenses in his notebooks and diaries, but was always willing to selflessly assist colleagues who asked for his help. His contemporaries also observed his light-heartedness in everyday communication and his subtle sense of humour.

The diligence and abilities of N.F. Katanov are evident from the data cited by M. Pinegin regarding his work in the Provisional Committee for Press Affairs (censorship). Katanov became a censor in 1906 on Pinegin's recommendation and reviewed at least 500 manuscripts annually for approval by Tatar publishers. This is in addition to the daily documents received from the governor's office, the gendarme department, and court presences, which amounted to at least 60 pages of texts in Arabic, Persian, Chagatai, Sartan, and other Oriental languages. M. Pinegin stated that Katanov was proficient in working with 50 Western and Eastern languages. However, some memoirs and publications suggest that he was familiar with up to 114 languages. Katanov was relieved of his duties as censor in 1916.

Nikolai Fyodorovich demonstrated minimal interest in literature and art. His personal library contained no works of fiction, and he did not attend theatre or concerts. He primarily read specialized literature and historical sources in the languages that he knew. Starting in 1888, he began collecting and regularly visited antique and junk dealers in Kazan. N. Katanov collected various artefacts related to the history, ethnography, and archaeology of Turkic peoples. However, he donated almost everything he had accumulated to museums. For instance, the Kazan University Museum possesses a collection of ritual accessories used in the Siberian shamanic cult, such as knives and tambourines. Nikolai Fedorovich was an outstanding expert in oriental numismatics, and his contemporaries believed that many collections in Kazan museums could be attributed solely to him. According to I.R. Gazizullin's calculations, the modern National Museum of the Republic of Tatarstan holds 1,790 items that were transferred by N.F. Katanov.

In this context, the participation of N. F. Katanov in the study of the "Historical and Archaeological Museum" of the Kazan collector, Professor N. F. Vysotsky, is noteworthy. "I consider it a pleasant duty," wrote N.F. Vysotsky in 1908, "to express here my heartfelt gratitude to Professor N.F. Katanov for his enlightened assistance in sorting and describing my collection.

Katanov was also characterised by an unwillingness to take part in any kind of discussion, whether political or purely scientific. According to the memoirs of K.V. Kharlampovich:

He never engaged in polemics, either literary or verbal. In case of attacks on him, he either kept silent or gave way, ready to abandon the position where the trouble arose.

=== Enlightenment and pedagogical views ===
K.I. Sultanbaeva published a number of articles specifically considering the pedagogical views of N.F. Katanov. According to the researcher, Katanov's views on education for Inorodtsy were inseparable from his personal experience and socio-cultural background. His views on the Inorodtsy question were not only influenced by his origin, but also by the environment in which he grew up and was formed. As a supporter of Russification, he believed it was beneficial for Turkic peoples. He dedicated his life to assisting Inorodtsy in their introduction to European culture and civilization. In his educational activities, Katanov consistently adhered to the ideas of missionary pedagogy. This approach emphasised the importance of studying the peculiarities of the languages, ethnography, history, and psychology of the peoples. To achieve a comprehensive understanding of different peoples, an integrated approach was necessary, taking into account their historical and cultural relationships and mutual influences. Katanov believed that the personality of the teacher played a central role in the education of Inorodtsy. Missionaries with only elementary parochial school education should not be considered as suitable teachers. The teacher should be scientifically trained and fluent in the language to present the school material both orally and in writing based on scientific principles. It is important to avoid arbitrary interpretations of the teaching material.

From the outset of his pedagogical career, N.F. Katanov had a dual objective: to conduct scientific research in Turkology and to provide specialized training to Russian Turkologists. The novice teacher, Katanov, had limited experience in rehearsing classmates at the gymnasium and university. However, he had a unique approach to pedagogy, incorporating a range of archaeological, historical, ethnographic, and folklore information. This information was not only obtained from literary sources but also from his first-hand experiences during his travels. Until 1915, N.F. Katanov was an associate professor, meaning attendance at his courses was optional. This required him to engage students with varying levels of motivation and preparedness. Several contemporaries' memoirs contain testimonies about N. F. Katanov's teaching methodology. For instance, N. A. Vasiliev attested:

N.F. Katanov's lectures were attended by an insignificant number of orientalist Turkologists. In my first year I heard from fellow lawyers Kozhevnikov and Ivanovsky that they had decided to attend N.F. Katanov's lectures; they confessed that, having accidentally got to his hours, they sat in his sparsely populated auditorium with the liveliest interest. They were struck by the simplicity, depth of presentation and clarity of thought on every topic in Nikolai Fedorovich's programme. He was not embarrassed by the listeners' questions either. Easily using lexical material from everyday life, he gave examples of vocabulary parallels, and the culture of the word, the greatest factor of human life, from Sanskrit roots to folk expressions of the Moscow suburbs, was really revealed.

Lectures were held in a small auditorium where the scholar had collected blocks of stone with Arabic script. N.F. Katanov did not like the pretentiousness of the language, which was characteristic of the leading teachers of the time, but according to the students' memories: '...his speech flowed freely, beautifully, with such a wide and exciting wave, like a silky waddle in the steppes where his childhood was spent.' According to N.V. Chekhov (referring to Katanov himself), Nikolai Fedorovich would ask students if they were Russian and then inform them that they already knew 25 Tatar words. For instance, he would take a Tatar word that has entered the Russian language, such as 'bashlyk', and explain that 'bash' means head and the suffix 'lyk' means an object in which something is put. K. I. Sultanbaeva identified several important didactic principles in his teaching activity:

According to N.V. Chekhov (referring to Katanov himself), Nikolai Fedorovich "would turn to the students and ask: 'Are you Russian?' After receiving an affirmative answer, he would say: 'So you already know 25 Tatar words.' For example, I take a Tatar word that has entered the Russian language, such as "bashlyk", and start to analyse it, saying that "bash" means head, and the suffix "lyk" means an object into which something is put". According to K.I. Sultanbaeva, the most important didactic principles of his teaching were:

1. the principle of synthesising and analysing the linguistic unit to facilitate understanding and assimilation;
2. the principle of relying on the native language of the listener;
3. the principle of developing the learner's linguistic sensitivity;
4. the principle of learning through accessible, real-life examples;
5. the principle of respect for native speakers and belief in a positive outcome;
6. the principle of integrating material from related fields of knowledge.

== Scientific Heritage. Historiography ==
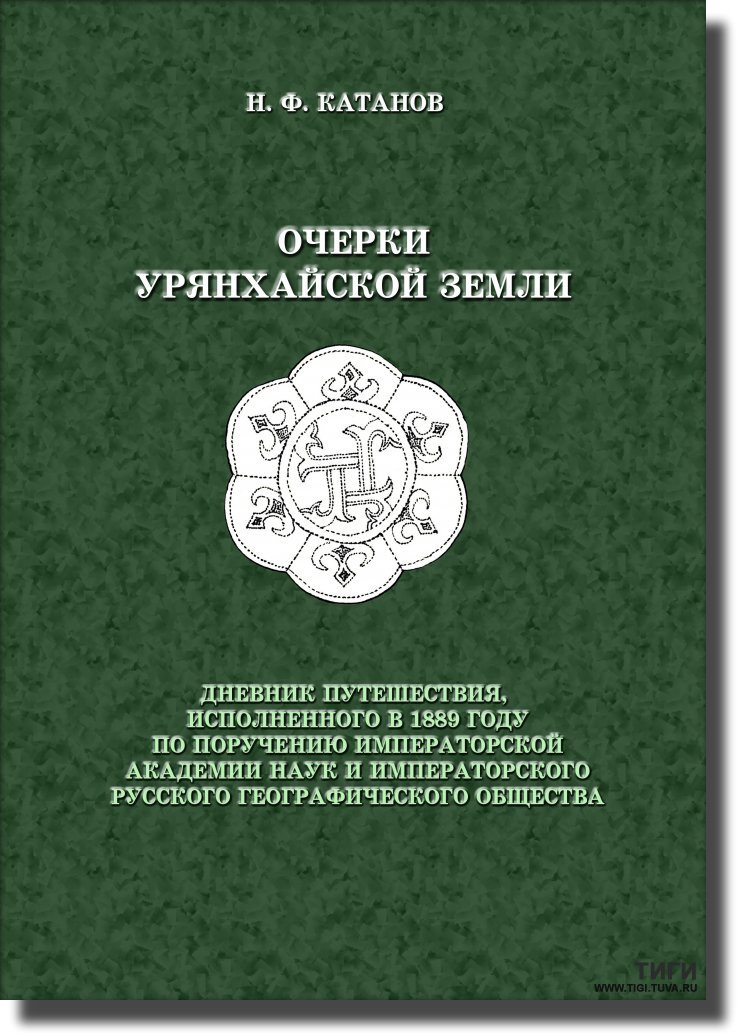
Cover of "Sketches of the Uryankhai Land" - the first edition of the diary of a trip to Tuva in 1889 (Kyzyl, 2011)

Despite the breadth of Katanov's scientific interests, his main areas of focus were always ethnography, folklore studies, and the comparative study of Turkic languages. N.F. Katanov and V.V. Radlov are considered by specialists to be the pioneers of comparative-historical studies, particularly in linguistic research. Katanov's 'Short Sagai-Russian Dictionary', compiled during his gymnasium years, contains 3090 commonly used lexical units. Its materials served as the basis for the Khakass-Russian dictionaries of the 1953 and 2006 editions. Katanov, a linguist, combined the study of Oriental languages with the collection of folklore from the Khakass, Tuvinians, Karagas, Sarts, Uyghurs, and other peoples of Southern Siberia and Eastern Turkestan. He accurately documented each message.

In 1921, N. F. Katanov listed his published works, which comprised approximately 380 bibliographic units. However, A. Karimullin's calculations suggest that this number should also encompass approximately 900 annotations, abstracts, and reviews written by Katanov. Additionally, the catalogues and indexes compiled by Katanov include at least 7000 titles of books in various European and Asian languages. Katanov's manuscript heritage has not been fully published and only partially uncovered. His personal collection, housed in the National Archive of the Republic of Tatarstan, contains 551 files, including correspondence, newspaper clippings, and other items. Additionally, the collection includes 471 items from his library, consisting mostly of educational literature and dictionaries in Arabic, Persian, and Turkish. The scholar's extensive and multifaceted activities are documented in various locations throughout Russia and abroad.

G.F. Blagova states that Katanov was a capable student of V. V. Radlov. However, he only continued his teacher's Turkological work in collecting materials on the language, folk literature, and ethnography of Turkic peoples who lived during his time. Following N.F. Katanov's death, his legacy was analysed in the central and Kazan press. Substantial obituaries were published by V.A. Gordlevsky, A.N. Samoilovich, N.M. Pokrovsky, K. V. Kharlampovich and others. These publications are characterised not only by the description of many remarkable facts of his biography, but also by the characterisation of the scholar's pedagogical and scientific activity, as well as various aspects of Nikolai Fyodorovich's Turkological legacy. V.A. Gordlevsky in his obituary "In memory of N.F. Katanov" was very critical of his legacy:

Katanov only adopted what others had written, but he lacked the creative element. He laid unpolished stones for the building of Turkology, but, as the Ottomans say, "every stone has its place". The historian of Oriental studies will be able to appreciate the work, long and selfless, which contributed a wealth of good quality material on the languages that were little studied before Katanov.

Following N.F. Katanov's death, the authorities began to view his name and scientific and public achievements negatively, due to their counter-revolutionary connotation from the perspective of Bolshevik ideology. In 1924, Tatar OGPU initiated a case against K.V. Kharlampovich, I.I. Satrapinsky, S.P. Shestakov, V.F. Smolin, S.I. Porfiriev, N.V. Nikolsky and I.M. Pokrovsky in connection with the received information about the grouping of the Black Hundred element in the Society of Archaeology, History and Ethnography. The article (obituary) by I.M. Pokrovsky on N.F. Katanov was called in the "Final Act" "a characteristic example of the missionary tendencies which play a predominant role in the activities of the Council of the Society". The name of N.F. Katanov, already deceased, was used as "a well-known prominent missionary" to prove the counter-revolutionary character of the orientation of the "Proceedings of the Society of Archaeology, History and Ethnography at the University of Kazan" and of the Society itself.

Nevertheless, objective assessments of N.F. Katanov's activities were actively used in numerous publications in the following years. The situation changed dramatically in the 1930s-1950s, when the number of publications about N.F. Katanov decreased many times over, and in the periodical press there were insults such as "a scholarly villein of the old regime" (the newspaper "Krasnaya Tataria", 1933) or "a reactionary in science" ("Scientific Notes of the Khakass Research Institute of Language, Literature and History", 1951). The scientific rehabilitation of Katanov began in 1958, when the posthumous article of S.E. Katanov appeared in the "Bulletin of the Academy of Sciences of the Kazakh SSR". Е. Malov's posthumous article was published in Abakan (the material dates back to 1922), and a collection of memories about the scientist, including his daughter's Anna Nikolaevna, was published. On the occasion of the 100th anniversary of Katanov's birth the famous Turkologist S.N. Ivanov wrote his biography, which was republished in 1973. Khakass scholars continued to work actively on the development of the heritage of their distinguished compatriot; in 1997 his "autobiography" (up to 1894) was published, compiled for use in the Vengerov dictionary.

Since 2000, there has been a renewed interest in Katanov's heritage following the publication of a trilingual collection of his selected articles on Sayan Turks in Ankara, written in Khakass, Russian, and Turkish. In 2003, poet A. Prelovskii published a two-volume work titled 'Folklore of the Sayan Turks of the 19th Century', which was based entirely on Katanov's materials published in 'Samples of Folk Literature of Turkic Tribes'. The first volume contained Prelovsky's poetic arrangements, while the second volume included unprocessed prose materials.

In 2004, the Khakass State University, named after N.F. Katanov, compiled the collection 'Selected Works on Khakassia and Adjacent Territories' (edited by S.A. Ugdyzhekov). The collection includes the main works of the Turkicologist on Khakass ethnography.

The diaries of a trip to Tuva in 1889 were only published in 2011. The manuscript, which was prepared by the author for printing, had been kept in the archives of the Peter the Great Museum of Anthropology and Ethnography (Kunstkamera).

In 2005, an international seminar titled 'The Legacy of N. F. Katanov: History and Culture of Turkic Peoples of Eurasia' was held in Kazan by R. M. Valeev and V. N. Tuguzhekova from the Khakass Research Institute of Language and Literature. The seminar resulted in the publication of a collection of works (2006) and a collective scientific biography titled 'N. F. Katanov and Humanities at the Turn of the Century'. During the latter half of the 2000s, Kazan published several books and articles by historian I. E. Alekseev, which focused on the Sobriety Society's activities. The researcher highlighted the irrationality of labelling Katanov's political views as 'liberal' ('inherent in an enlightened inorodets'). On the contrary, numerous facts indicate the scientist's conservative beliefs.

In the 1920s, Karl Menges was granted full access to the East Turkestan text archive collected by N. Katanov, which consisted of 2,384 manuscript pages. From this collection, the researcher chose several texts that were later published by the Prussian Academy of Sciences. In 1933, Menges published 33 folklore texts. However, due to his emigration from the Third Reich, the work was delayed. In 1936, the second edition, which included Menges' bibliography, was announced under the editorship of György Khazai. In 1943, an edition of only 100 copies published another 56 texts, which became extremely rare. The edition did not mention Menges' name, but it named Katanov as the author of the work done in the preface. In 1954, Menges published a dictionary for both volumes of folklore texts. In 1976, the Institute of Ancient History and Archaeology of the GDR undertook a phototypical reprint of both Volkskundliche Texte aus Ost-Türkistan aus dem Nachlass von N. Th. Katanov.

In Western historiography, N.F. Katanov's work has gained renewed attention in the 2000s. R. Geraci's monograph portrays Katanov's experience as both unique and typical in the context of Russification. At the same time, there was a mixture of personal and professional identification. Acknowledging him as a supporter of Russification and Christianisation of "Inorodtsy" the researcher quoted Katanov's words quoted in Zaki Validi's memoirs:

Of the Mongolians and Eastern Turks, three people - Dorzhi Banzarov, Chokan Valikhanov and myself - took the path of Orientalism. Each of us devoted himself entirely to Russian literature. I renounced shamanism and became a Christian in order to serve their science. Chokan and Dorzhi died of vodka before the age of 35, because our Russian colleagues taught us nothing but to drink. You will be the fourth person in this environment, but be careful. The cultural environment in which I was born and raised is not as powerful as Islam, the existence of our people is deplorable, and in the Russian environment we remained strangers.

Agnes Nilufer Kefili's monograph provides examples of N. F. Katanov's censorship of textbooks for New-Methodist madrasas in 1910. Katanov criticized fragments of texts by Maksudi and Karimi, which claimed that Adam and Eve lived in the vicinity of Mecca, Adam was buried in India, and Judas, not Jesus, was crucified. Katanov also objected to the recommendations on washing the genitals in preparation for namaz. It was decided to use these manuals only for older students who had already received a course in European sciences in Russian and had developed 'critical thinking'.

== Memorialisation ==
On 28 September 1987, on the basis of the museum of the Askiz secondary school, the Askiz public museum of local history named after N.F. Katanov (now - the Askizsk district museum of local history named after N.F. Katanov) was established. On 10 August 1994, by the decision of the Presidium of the Supreme Soviet and the Council of Ministers of the Republic of Khakassia, the name of N.F. Katanov was given to the Khakassian State University (KhSU). In the same year, the Supreme Council of the Republic established the State Prize named after N.F. Katanov, which is awarded to the most outstanding scientists. Since then, the traditional 'Katanov Readings' have been held at N.F. Katanov KhSU.

In 1996, the Council of Ministers of the Republic of Khakassia issued surrogate money in the denomination of 5000 rubles, commonly referred to as 'katanovki' due to the portrait of the scientist on the reverse of the banknote.

In 2005, Shkolny Lane in Kazan, where N.F. Katanov resided, was officially renamed Katanovsky Lane. Prior to the revolution, it had already been informally referred to by this name. (Note: The death certificate shows the last address of the scientist: Kazan, 3rd Gymnasium Lane, 3, flat 4. The collection of the L. R. Kyzlasov Khakass National Museum of Local Lore contains an undated business card of N. F. Katanov, which shows an earlier address: "Kazan, Novo-Komissariat Street, Rannenheim's house".) The International Independent Association of Sobriety has also suggested erecting a monument to Katanov in the city, restoring his house, and establishing a 'Museum of Sobriety' there. On 26 October 2007, a monument to N.F. Katanov was erected in Abakan on Lenin Avenue, next to the N.F. Katanov KhSU park. The monument, created by Krasnoyarsk sculptor Konstantin Zinich, depicts the scientist in full height, holding a book in his hand. The opening of the monument was part of the last anniversary block, the Days of Khakass writing and culture.

On 9 August 2011, the Government of the Republic of Khakassia adopted Resolution No. 507 "On the proclamation of 2012 as the Year of N.F. Katanov in the Republic of Khakassia", which, in particular, "notes the great importance of the personality and scientific activity of the orientalist-turkologist Nikolai Fedorovich Katanov for the development of culture and science in the Republic of Khakassia". The same resolution approved the "Action plan for the year of N.F. Katanov in 2012 in the Republic of Khakassia". On 20 May 2022, a monument to N.F. Katanov was unveiled in the village of Askiz, on the banks of the river of the same name, opposite the local administration building.

== Main works of Nikolai Katanov ==
- Отчет о поездке в Восточную Сибирь, Монголию и северный Китай в 1890 и 1891 гг. // Живая старина. — St. Petersburg, 1892. — pp. 111–122, 134–137.
- Сагайские татары Минусинского округа Енисейской губернии // Живая старина. — 1893. — Iss. 4, part III. — pp. 559–570.
- Письма из Сибири и Восточного Туркестана / Предисловие Радлова В. В. // Записки Имп. Императорской Академии наук. — 1893. — Vol. XXIII. — pp. 1–114.
- Среди тюркских племен // Известия Имп. Рус. Географического Общества. — 1893. — Vol. XXIX. — pp. 519–541.
- Качинская легенда о сотворении мира (Записана в Минусинском округе Енисейской губернии на качинском наречии тюркского языка 2 июня 1890 г.) // Известия Общества археологии, истории и этнографии. — 1894. — Vol. XII, Iss. 2. — pp. 185–188.
- О погребальных обрядах у тюркских племен с древнейших времен до наших дней // ИОАИЭ. — 1894. — Vol. XII, Iss. 2. — pp. 109–142.
- Народные приметы и поверья бельтиров // Деятель. — 1896. — No. 8. — pp. 424–425.
- О поездке действительного члена Общества археологии, истории и этнографии Н. Ф. Катанова в Минусинский округ Енисейской губернии // ИОАИЭ. — 1897. — Vol. XIX, iss. 2. — pp. 219–221.
- Отчет о поездке, совершенной с 15 мая по 1 сентября 1896 года в Минусинский округ Енисейской губернии // Ученые записки Казанского университета. — 1897. — Vol. 64, book III. — pp. 1–50.
- Материалы к изучению казанско-татарского наречия. Part 1: Образцы книжной и устной литературы казанских татар // Учёные записки Казанского университета. — 1897, book 12, annex, — pp. 1–32.
- "Предание тобольских татар о грозном царе Тамерлане". Ежегодник Тобольского губернского музея (IX). Tobolsk: 50–52. 1898.
- Винокурение у абаканских татар Енисейской губернии // Деятель. — 1899. — No. 8/9. — pp. 312–314.
- Народные способы лечения у сагайцев (Минусинского уезда Енисейской губ.) // Деятель. — 1899. — No. 10. — pp. 394–395.
- Материалы к изучению казанско-татарского наречия. Part 2: Русский перевод образцов книжной и устной литературы казанских татар // Учёные записки Казанского университета. — 1899. — book 5–6. — pp. 1–113.
- Отчет о поездке в Минусинский уезд Енисейской губернии, совершенный летом 1899 года // Учёные записки Казанского университета. — 1901. — Vol. 63, book V—VI. — pp. 1–58.
- Опыт исследования урянхайского языка с указанием главнейших родственных отношений его к другим языкам тюркского корня. — Kazan, 1903. — XLII, 487, LX p.
- О религиозных войнах учеников шейха Багаутдина против инородцев Западной Сибири // Учёные записки Казанского университета. — 1903. — book XII. — pp. 133–146.
- Наречия урянхайцев, абаканских татар и карагасов // Образцы народной литературы тюркских племён, under ed. В. В. Радлова. Part IX. — St. Petersburg, 1907. Vol. I (texts), VI+XXXII+68+XLVIII с.; Vol. II (translations), VI+XXV+658 p.
- Предания присаянских племен о прежних делах и людях // Сборник в честь 70-летия Г. Н. Потанина. — St. Petersburg, 1909. — pp. 265–288.
- Обработка сочинения писателя XVII в. Н. Г. Спафария «Описание первыя части вселенныя, именуемой Азия, в ней же состоит Китайское государство с прочими его городы и провинции». — Kazan, 1910. — LVI, 271 p.
- Краткий татарско-русский словарь в транскрипциях арабской и русской в объёме I части учебника М. Ф. Каримова «Тарихи анбия (история пророков)». — Kazan, 1912. — XXIV, 265 p. (lithography).
- Восточная хронология. Из курса лекций, читанных в Северо-восточном археологическом и этнографическом институте в 1918—1919 учебн. году. — Kazan, 1920. — 240 p.
- Volkskundliche Texte aus Ost-Türkistan. I. — (Sitzungsberichte der Berliner Akademie der Wissenschaften, XXXII.). — Berlin, 1933.
- Volkskundliche Texte aus Ost-Türkistan. II. Aus dem Nachlaß von N. Th. Katanov herausgegeben. — (Als Manuskript getruct). — Berlin, 1943.
- Хакасский фольклор (From the book «Образцы народной литературы тюркских племён», vol. IX. St. Petersburg, 1907). — Abakan, 1963. — 163 p.
- Николай Федорович Катанов. Автобиография и библиография / Comp. and ed. Doctor of History И. Л. Кызласов. Moscow — Abakan, 1997.
- Таллал алған пілiг тоғыстары. Хакас фольклорының паза этнографиязының тексттерi = Избранные научные труды. Тексты хакасского фольклора и этнографии = Bilimsel eserlerinden segneler. Hakas folkloru ve etnografyasi metenleri / Comp. B. H. Тугужекова, B. E. Майногашева. Translations into Khakass language B.E. Майногашевой and С. Е. Карачакова. — Ankara, 2000. — 550 p.
- Фольклор саянских тюрков XIX века. Из собрания Н. Ф. Катанова / Comp., transl., verse arrangements, lit. editions, concluding article and commentary А. В. Преловского. In 2 vol. — Moscow, 2003. — 576 p. + 624 p.
- Избранные труды о Хакасии и сопредельных территориях / Comp. Угдыжеков С. А. — Abakan: Pub. ХГУ им. Н. Ф. Катанова, 2004.
- Очерки Урянхайской земли. Дневник путешествия, исполненного в 1889 году / Manuscript preparation, commentary А. К. Кужугет. — Kyzyl, 2011.
- Наследие российской тюркологии XIX в.: «Путешествие по Сибири, Дзунгарии и Восточному Туркестану». Дневник путешествия, совершенного по поручению Императорского Русского Географического Общества в 1890 г. членом-сотрудником оного Н. Ф. Катановым / scholarly ed.: Р. М. Валеев, В. Н. Тугужекова, Д. Е. Мартынов. Введение Р. М. Валеева, Д. Е. Мартынова, Ю. А. Мартыновой и В. Н. Тугужековой. Preparation for the edition, comp., commentaries, indexes Д. А. Данькиной, Р. М. Валеева, Р. З. Валеевой, Д. Е. Мартынова, Ю. А. Мартыновой, Ф. Г. Миниханова, М. С. Минеевой, В. Н. Тугужековой. Introductory articles А. М. Сибагатуллина, И. Г. Смолиной, И. Р. Гафурова. — Kazan: Pub. «Артефакт», 2017. — 734 p.

== Bibliography ==
- Алексеев, И.Е. (2009). На страже Империи. Vol. III: Статьи и документы по истории черносотенства, русского национализма, дворянства, политического сыска и белого движения. Kazan: ООО «Астория». pp. 31–48.
- Благова, Г.Ф. (2012). История тюркологии в России (вторая половина XIX — начало XX в.). Moscow: Восточная литература. ISBN 978-5-02-036506-3.
- Бутанаев, В.Я. (1994). Происхождение хакасских родов и фамилий. Abakan: Лаборатория Этнографии НИС АГПИ.
- Валеев, Р.М.; Мартынов, Д.Е. (2009). Российское университетское востоковедение в архивных документах: центры, события и наследие (XIX — начало XX вв.). Kazan: Казанский государственный университет. ISBN 978-5-98180-738-1.
- Валеев, Р.М.; Тугужекова, В.Н. (2009). Валеев, Р.М.; Тугужекова, В.Н. (eds.). Н. Ф. Катанов и гуманитарные науки на рубеже веков: Очерки истории российской тюркологии. Kazan - Abakan: Алма-Лит. ISBN 978-5-98245-051-7.
- Иванов, С.Н. (1973). Николай Фёдорович Катанов, 1862—1922: Очерк жизни и деятельности. Русские востоковеды и путешественники (2 ed.). Наука (ГРВЛ).
- Кокова, И.Ф. (2012). Николай Федорович Катанов: Документальная повесть о выдающемся российском востоковеде (2 ed.). Abakan: Хакасское книжное издательство. ISBN 978-5-7091-0541-6.
- Н. Ф. Катанов — гордость земли хакасской: биобиблиографический справочник (PDF). Comp. Куюкова Н.И. Abakan: ГБУК РХ «Хакасская РДБ». 2012. Archived from the original (PDF) on 2020-01-31.
- Назипова, Г.Р. (2004). Университет и музей: исторический опыт губернской Казани. Kazan: РИЦ «Школа».
- Валеев, Р.М.; Закиев, М.З.; Зайнуллин, Д.Г., eds. (2006). Наследие Н. Ф. Катанова: история и культура тюркских народов Евразии: Доклады и сообщения международного научного семинара, 30 июня — 1 июля 2005 г. Kazan: Алма Лит.
- Наследие хакасского учёного, тюрколога, доктора сравнительного языкознания, востоковеда Николая Федоровича Катанова: материалы Международной научной конференции, посвящённой 150-летию со дня рождения учёного. 16–19 мая 2012 г. (PDF). Vol. 1. Abakan: Хакасское книжное издательство. 2012. ISBN 978-5-7091-0543-0. Archived from the original (PDF) on 2021-08-02.
- Нилогов, А.С. (2018). "Родословная Николая Фёдоровича Катанова" (PDF). Архивные документы в системе объективного научного знания. Материалы III Межрегиональной научно-практической конференции. Abakan: ООО «Книжное издательство «Бригантина»: 161–169. Archived from the original (PDF) on 2021-04-25.\
- Нилогов, А.С. (2020). "О находке брачного обыска Н. Ф. Катанова и А. И. Тихоновой за 1892 год". Сибирский архив (4): 19–30. ISSN 2686-9446.
- Нилогов, А. (2023-12-13). "Найдена актовая запись о смерти хакасского учёного Н. Ф. Катанова". Абакан (49): 31.
- Покровский, И.М. (1923). "Памяти проф. Н. Ф. Катанова". Известия Общества археологии, истории и этнографии при Казанском университете. 32 (2). Kazan: 245−259.
- Рыкин, П.О. (2011). "Николай Фёдорович Катанов (1862—1922): вехи жизни и творчества". Очерки Урянхайской земли. Kyzyl: ТИГИ при правительстве РТ: 359–383.
- Султанбаева, К.И. (2009). Николай Федорович Катанов — выдающийся ученый-востоковед, тюрколог, просветитель. Abakan: Изд-во Хакас, гос. у-та им. Н. Ф. Катанова. ISBN 978-5-7810-0556-7.
- Чебодаева, М.П.; Валеев, Р.М.; Данькина, Н.А. (2023). С берегов Аскиза до берегов Невы. Научный путь профессора Н. Ф. Катанова (1862—1922). Saint Petersburg. ISBN 978-5-7422-8207-5.
- Geraci, R.P. (2001). "Nikolai F. Katanov: Inorodets in the Russian Academy". Window on the East: National and Imperial Identities in Late Tsarist Russia. The Wilder House Series in Politics, History, and Culture. Ithaca and L.: Cornell University Press. pp. 309–342. ISBN 080143422X.
- Volkskundliche Texte aus Ost-Türkistan aus d. Nachlaß von N. Th. Katanov; mit e. Vorw. zum Neudr. von Karl Heinrich Menges u. e. Bibliogr. d. Schriften Menges' von Georg Hazai (in German). Leipzig: Zentralantiquariat d. Dt. Demokrat. Republik. 1976.
