= Uvat =

Uvat (Russian: Уват) is the name of several rural localities in Russia:

- Uvat, Irkutsk Oblast, a village in Nizhneudinsky District of Irkutsk Oblast
- Uvat, Tyumen Oblast, a selo in Uvatsky Rural Okrug of Uvatsky District of Tyumen Oblast
