= Institute of Philology of the Siberian Branch of the RAS =

Research institute in Russia

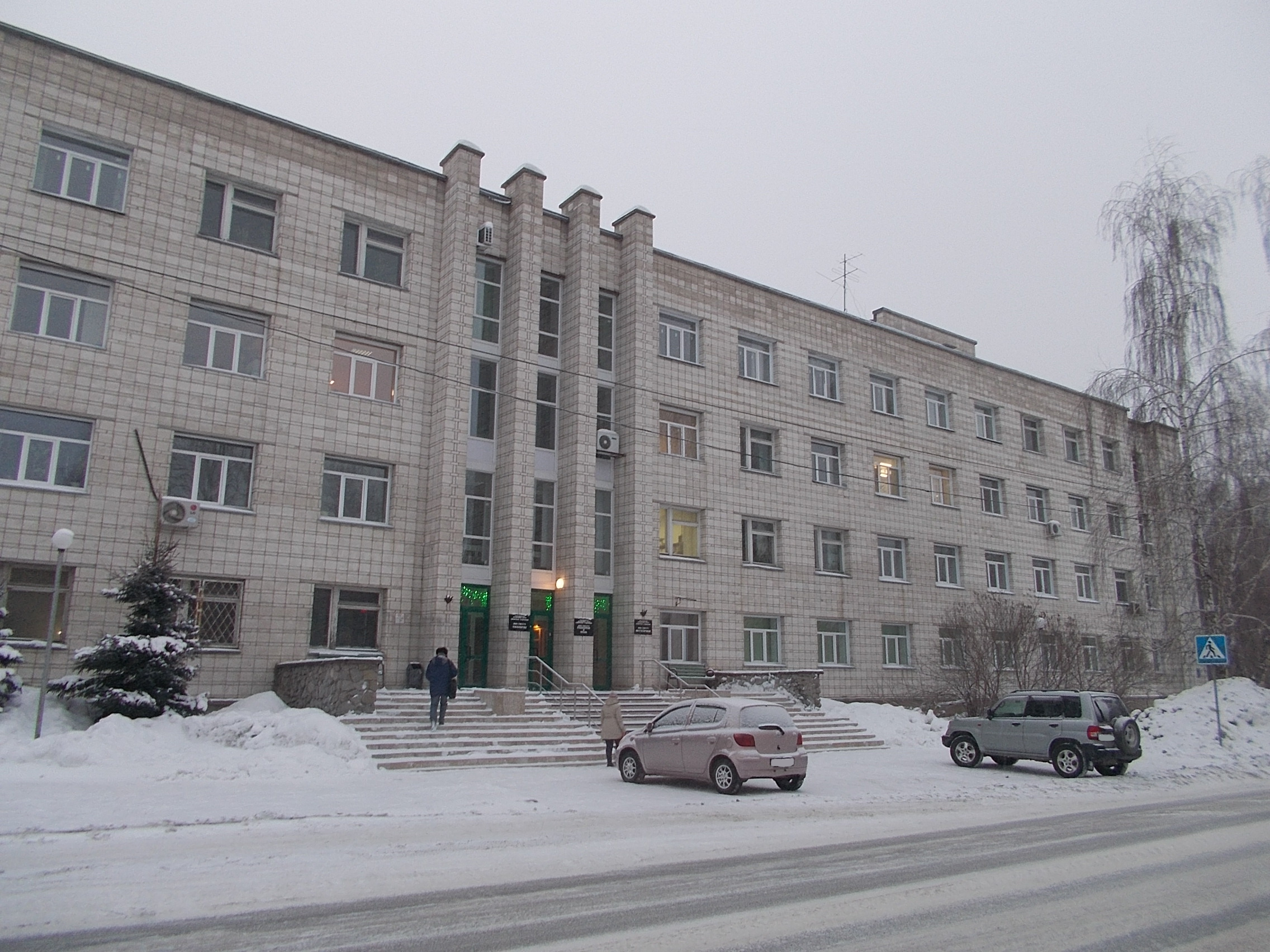
- Established: 1990
- Director: I. V. Silantyev
- Owner: Siberian Branch of RAS
- Address: Nikolaev Street, 8, Novosibirsk, 630090, Russia
- Location: Novosibirsk, Russia
- Website: philology.nsc.ru

Institute of Philology of the Siberian Branch of the RAS (Russian: Институт филологии СО РАН) is a research institute based in Akademgorodok of Novosibirsk, Russia.

== History ==
In 1966, the Institute of History, Philology, and Philosophy was created in Novosibirsk. Institute of Philology was founded in 1990 as part of the United Institute of History, Philology and Philosophy of the Siberian Branch of the Academy of Sciences of the USSR.

In 2006, the institute became an independent organization of the SB RAS
