= Inorodtsy =

Category of population

In the Russian Empire, inorodtsy (Russian: иноро́дцы) (singular: inorodets (Russian: инородец), literally meaning "of different descent/nation", "of alien origin") was a special ethnicity-based category of population that received a special treatment under the law. Informally, the term referred to all non-Slavic subjects of the empire.

The term is sometimes translated as allogeneous (people) (cf. "allogenes") and sometimes as "aliens". The latter translation is misleading since in most cases the term was applied to the indigenous population of Siberia, Central Asia, and Russian Far East.

== History ==
Initially, a legal statute was introduced for special treatment of certain peoples of Russia (including a certain degree of protection for their traditional life) for which some laws of the empire were deemed inappropriate. Over time, the term acquired a pejorative connotation. Privileges and special treatment for inorodtsy varied depending on the group, area, and time period, but often included exemption of military service, reduction or exemption of taxes, protection of grazing lands, and religious and governmental self-administration.

The 19th century Russian code of law (beginning with the 1822 Statute on the Administration of Inorodtsy) distinguished the following categories of inorodtsy:

- Siberian inorodtsy, all indigenous peoples of Siberia; some of them were in separate categories due to their "incomplete dependence on Russia":
  - Chukchi of Primorskaya Oblast
  - Dzhungarians (дзюнгорцы) of Tomsk Governorate
  - Inorodtsy of Commander Islands
- Samoyeds of Arkhangelsk Governorate
- Kalmucks
- "Kyrgyzs" (obsolete name: see the contemporary map; now the ethnicity in this area is known as Kazakhs) of the Interior Horde
- Nomadic inorodtsy of Akmolinsk, Semipalatinsk, Semirechye, Ural, and Turgay oblasts
- Turkestan Krai inorodtsy
- Transcaspian Oblast nomads (ordyntsy, "Horde people")
- Mountain people of Caucasus
- Jews
