= Tobol-Irtysh Tatar dialect =

Dialect of the Siberian Tatar language

Tobol-Irtysh Tatar
- Native to: Russia
- Region: Tyumen Oblast, Omsk Oblast
- Ethnicity: Tobol-Irtysh Tatars
- Language family: Turkic: Common Turkic; Kipchak; Kipchak–Nogai; Siberian Tatar; Tobol-Irtysh Tatar
- Dialects: Tyumen; Tobol; Eastern Tobol (Tokuz-Uvat): Zabolotny; Tevriz (Kurdak, Kurtak); Tara

Language codes
- ISO 639-3: –
- Glottolog: tobo1249

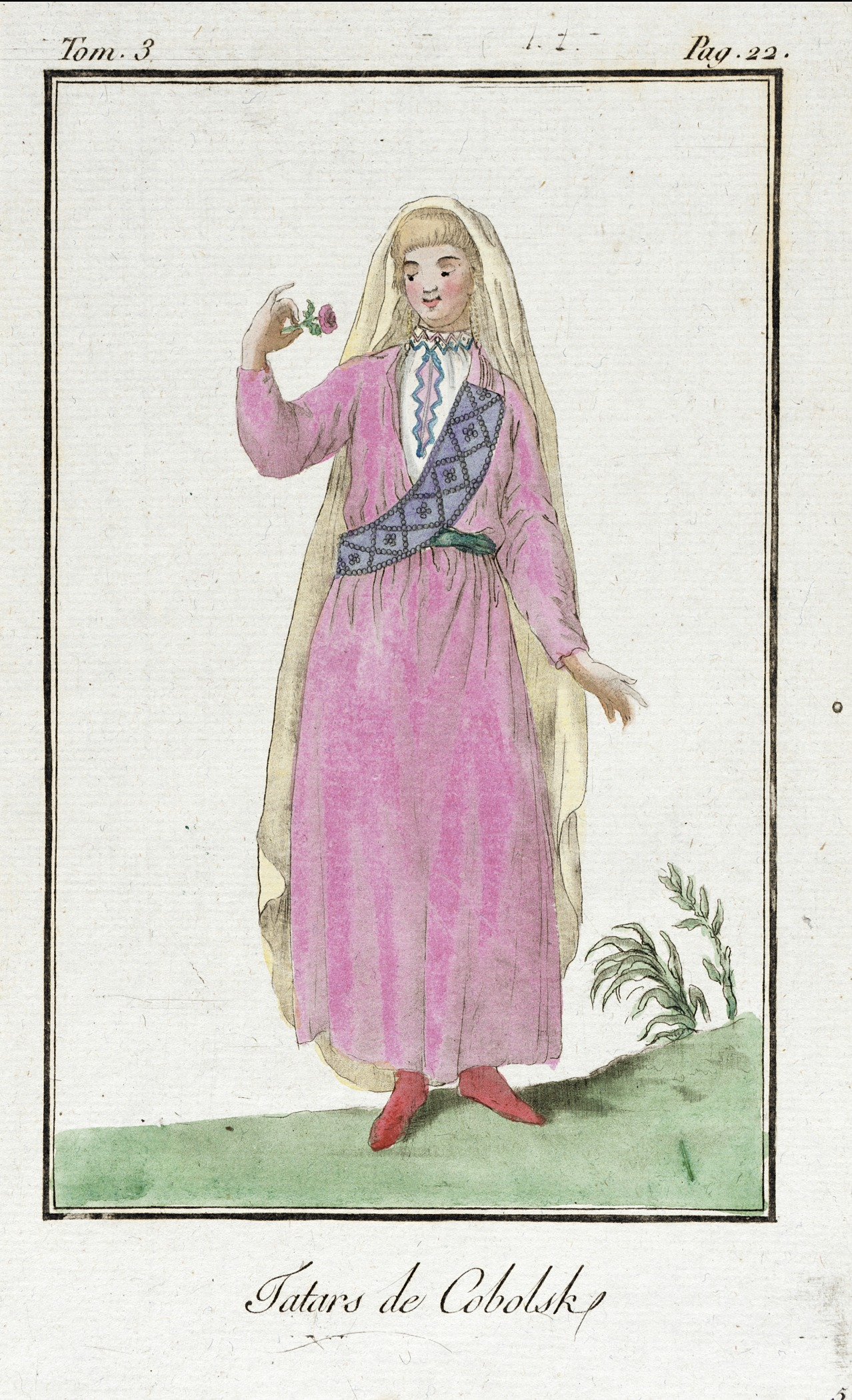
A Tobol Tatar

The Tobol-Irtysh Tatar dialect is a dialect of Siberian Tatar language spoken in Tyumen and Omsk Oblast in Russia, and gets its name from the Tobol and Irtysh rivers.

== Classification ==
It is generally classed among the dialects of the Tatars of Siberia, of which some also speak Baraba Tatar. Johanson groups these dialects under the name of Western Siberian Tatar.

== Dialects ==
According to Tumasheva, Tobol-Irtysh Tatar has 5 dialects:

- Tyumen - Tyumensky, Yalutorovsky, Nizhnetavdinsky, Isetsky, Zavodoukovsky, Yarkovsky Districts of Tyumen Oblast
- Tobol with Tokuz-Uvat (Eastern Tobol) - Tyumensky (with former Baikalovsky), Vagaysky (with former Dubrovinsky), Yarkovsky Districts of Tyumen Oblast
- Zabolotny - Tobolsky, Uvatsky Districts of Tyumen Oblast
- Tevriz (Kurdak, Kurtak) - Tevrizsky, Ust-Ishimsky, Znamensky Districts of Omsk Oblast, plus some settlements in Tyumen Oblast's Vagaysky District
- Tara - Tarsky, Bolsherechensky, Kolosovsky, Muromtsevsky Districts of Omsk Oblast

The Tevriz dialect has elements of Southern Altai, Khakas and Shor.

== Orthography ==
In 2000, a primer of Tobol-Irtysh Tatar was published. Its orthography includes the letters of the Russian alphabet, plus the extra letters Ә ә, Ғ ғ, Ҡ ҡ, Ң ң, Ө ө, and Ү ү.

== See also ==
- Siberian Tatars
