= Siberian Tatar language =

Kipchak Turkic language spoken in Western Siberia

Siberian Tatar
- Себер тел
- Native to: Russia
- Region: Omsk, Tyumen, Novosibirsk, Tomsk, Kemerovo, Sverdlovsk Oblasts (regions); Turkey
- Ethnicity: Siberian Tatars
- Native speakers: 150,000
- Language family: Turkic: Common Turkic; Kipchak; Kipchak–Kyrgyz and Kipchak–Nogai; Siberian Tatar
- Dialects: Tobol-Irtysh Tatar; Baraba Tatar; Tom Tatar
- Writing system: Cyrillic

Language codes
- ISO 639-3: sty
- Glottolog: sibe1250 kalm1245
- Siberian Tatar is classified as Definitely Endangered by the UNESCO Atlas of the World's Languages in Danger.

Siberian Tatar (Siberian Tatar: Себер тел) or Siberian is a Turkic language spoken by about 140,000 Siberian Tatars in Western Siberia, Russia, primarily in the Tyumen, Novosibirsk, Omsk, Tomsk and Kemerovo Oblasts, but also in Sverdlovsk Oblast. According to Marcel Erdal, due to its particular characteristics, Siberian Tatar can be considered as a bridge between Kipchak and Siberian Turkic languages.

== Dialects ==
Siberian Tatar consists of three dialects: Tobol-Irtysh, Baraba and Tom. According to D. G. Tumasheva, the Baraba dialect is grammatically closest to the southern dialect of Altai, Kyrgyz and has significant grammatical similarities with Chulym, Khakas, Shor, and Tuvan. The Tom dialect is, in her opinion, even closer to Altai and similar languages. The Tevriz sub-dialect of the Tobol-Irtysh dialect shares significant elements with the Siberian Turkic languages, namely Altai, Khakas and Shor.

Although Gabdulkhay Akhatov was a Volga Tatar, he immersed into studying of the phonetic peculiarities of Siberian Tatar language of the indigenous population of Siberia, the Siberian Tatars. In his work "The Dialect of the West Siberian Tatars" (1963) Akhatov wrote about Tobol-Irtysh Siberian Tatars, a western group of Siberian Tatars, who are indigenous to the Omsk and Tyumen Oblasts.

In his work "Dialect of the West Siberian Tatars" (1963) Gabdulkhay Akhatov wrote about a territorial resettlement of the Tobol-Irtysh Tatars Tyumen and Omsk areas. Subjecting a comprehensive integrated analysis of the phonetic system, the lexical composition and grammatical structure, the scientist concluded that the language of the Siberian Tatars is a separate language, it is divided into three dialects and it is one of the most ancient Turkic languages. Professor G. Akhatov named Siberian Tatar dialects of Tyumen and Omsk Oblasts dialects of the West Siberian Tatars, while dialects of Baraba and Tom Tatars he named dialects of the East Siberian Tatars.

Some works further differentiate sub-dialects of three aforementioned dialects, breaking them down as follows:

- Tobol-Irtysh Tatar dialect
  - Tyumen sub-dialect (Tyumensky District, Yalutorovsky District, and Nizhnetavdinsky District of Tyumen Oblast)
  - Tobol sub-dialect (Tobolsky District, Vagaysky District, Yarkovsky District of Tyumen Oblast)
    - Eastern Tobol (Tokuz-Uvat) variety (Vagaysky District)
  - Zabolotny sub-dialect (Tobolsky District and Nizhnetavdinsky District of Tyumen Oblast)
  - Tevriz (Kurdak, Kurtak) sub-dialect (Tevrizsky District, Ust-Ishimsky District, Znamensky District of Omsk Oblast, plus some settlements in Tyumen Oblast's Vagaysky District)
  - Tara sub-dialect (Tarsky District, Bolsherechensky District, Kolosovsky District of Omsk Oblast)
- Baraba Tatar dialect (spoken throughout the Baraba steppe)
- Tom Tatar dialect
  - Eushtino-Chatsk (Tomsky District, Tomsk Oblast)
    - Orsk Chat sub-dialect (Kolyvansky District, Novosibirsk Oblast)
  - Kalmak (Yurginsky District, Kemerovo Oblast)

Baraba and Tom dialects of Siberian Tatar language belong to Kyrgyz–Kipchak subdivision of Turkic languages, together with Kyrgyz, Southern Altai, Teleut, and Telengit. Tobol-Irtysh dialect belongs to Kipchak–Nogai subdivision of Turkic languages, which also includes Nogai, Karagash, steppe dialect of Crimean Tatar, Kazakh, Karakalpak, and Kipchak dialects of Uzbek.

== Phonology ==
=== Vowels ===
| | Front | | Back | |
| | unrounded | rounded | unrounded | rounded |
|---|---|---|---|---|
| Close | и /i/ | ү /y/ | | у /u/ |
| Mid | е /e/ | ө /ø/ | ы /ɤ/ | о /o/ |
| Open | ә /æ/ | | а /a/ | |

=== Consonants ===
| | Bilabial | Alveolar | Post- alveolar | Velar | Uvular |
|---|---|---|---|---|---|
| Nasal | м /m/ | н /n/ | | (ң /ŋ/) | ң /ɴ/ |
| Plosive | п /p/ | т /t/ | | к /k/ | қ /q/ |
| Fricative | б /β/ | с /s/ | ш /ʃ/ | г /ɣ/ | ғ /ʁ/ |
| Affricate | | ц /t͡s/ | | | |
| Trill | | р /r/ | | | |
| Approximant | в /w/ | л /l/ | й /j/ | | |

/ŋ/ can be an allophone of /ɴ/.

== Alphabet ==
Siberian Tatar alphabet and IPA pronunciation:

| Letter | Pronunciation | Notes |
|---|---|---|
| А а | [a] | |
| Ә ә | [æ] | |
| Б б | [b]; [β] | |
| В в | [v]; [w] | |
| Г г | [ɡ]; [ɣ] | |
| Ғ ғ | [ɣ] | |
| Д д | [d] | |
| Е е | [e] | Also [je] in Russian loanwords |
| Ё ё | [jo] | Only in Russian loanwords |
| Ж ж | [ʒ]; [ʑ] | |
| З з | [z] | |
| И и | [i] | |
| Й й | [j] | |
| К к | [k] | |
| Қ қ | [q] | |
| Л л | [l] | |
| М м | [m] | |
| Н н | [n] | |
| Ң ң | [ŋ]; [ɴ] | |
| О о | [ʊ̞]; [o] | |
| Ө ө | [œ] | |
| П п | [p] | |
| Р р | [r] | |
| С с | [s] | |
| Т т | [t] | |
| У у | [u]; [w] | Examples of it making the two sounds: ул – [ul]; уақыт – uaqıt [waqıt] |
| Ү ү | [y]; [w] | Example of it making the two sounds: күреү – küreü [kyrew] |
| Ф ф | [f] | |
| Х х | [χ] | |
| Ц ц | [t͡s] | |
| Ч ч | [tʃ]; [tɕ] | |
| Ш ш | [ʃ]; [ɕ] | |
| Щ щ | [ɕɕ] | Only in Russian loanwords |
| Ъ ъ | [-] | Only in Russian loanwords |
| Ы ы | [ɤ]; [ɯ] | |
| Ь ь | [ʲ] | Only in Russian loanwords |
| Э э | [e] | Only at the beginning of a word |
| Ю ю | [ju] | Only in Russian loanwords |
| Я я | [ja] | Only in Russian loanwords |

== Bibliography ==
- Сагидуллин, Максим (2008). Фонетика и графика современного сибирскотатарского языка (in Russian). Тюмень: Искер. ISBN 9785875911293.
- Сагидуллин, Максим (2014). Грамматика современного сибирскотатарского языка (in Russian). Тюменский дом печати. ISBN 9785875912368.
- Сагидуллин, Максим (2010). Русско–сибирскотатарский словарь / Урысца–себертатарца сүслек (in Russian and Siberian Tatar). Тюмень: Мандр и Ка. ISBN 978-5930204414.
