= Conversion table for Y chromosome haplogroups =

Cross-referencing different names for Human Y chromosome DNA groupings

In human population genetics, Y chromosome haplogroups define the major lineages of direct paternal (male) lines back to a shared common ancestor in Africa. Men in the same haplogroup share a set of differences, or markers, on their Y-chromosome, which distinguish them from men in other haplogroups. These UEPs, or markers used to define haplogroups, are SNP mutations. Y-chromosome haplogroups all form family trees or phylogenies, with both branches or sub-clades diverging from a common haplogroup ancestor, and also with all haplogroups themselves linked into one family tree which traces back ultimately to the most recent shared male line ancestor of all men alive today, called in popular science Y Chromosome Adam.

== History ==
=== Creation of the Y-Chromosome Consortium ===
In the 1980s and 1990s, individual academic research groups each had their own nomenclature for naming Y-chromosome haplogroups. This created an increasingly unmanageable communication barrier. In 2002, the Y-Chromosome Consortium (YCC) published a widely used proposal to standardize the naming of all Y-chromosome haplogroups. This effort was based on comprehensive retesting of DNA samples (YCC 2002).

The Y-Chromosome Consortium for many years left individual groups to maintain this standard. In 2008, they again published a comprehensive review of tree changes and retested samples. With this work, they strengthened their recommendation to move to a nomenclature system they referred to as shorthand (Karafet 2008).

=== Creation of the International Society of Genetic Genealogy (ISOGG) Tree Committee ===
In 2006, a group of citizen scientists with an interest in genetic genealogy formed a working group to document both their own discoveries and those in published research. They created a web based tree that attempted to be timely and had annual benchmark versions.

Independent efforts to develop Y-DNA haplogroup nomenclature have also continued outside the ISOGG Tree Committee. One such initiative is CAROH NOMENCLATURE — Continuous Alphanumeric Representation Of Haplogroups, an open specification for generating linear haplogroup labels algorithmically from a Y-DNA phylogenetic tree.

== Conversion table ==
The table below brings together all of these works at the point of the landmark 2002 YCC Tree. This allows a researcher reviewing older published literature to quickly move between nomenclatures.

Ancestral clade - terminal mutation (Note: Terminal mutations are often not unique, other equally descriptive mutations may be listed separated by colons.)	ISOGG 2019-2020	(α)	(β)	(γ)	(δ)	(ε)	(ζ)	(η)	YCC 2002 (by lineage)	YCC 2005 (by lineage)	YCC 2008 (by lineage)	YCC 2010r (by lineage)	ISOGG 2006	ISOGG 2007	ISOGG 2008	ISOGG 2009	ISOGG 2010	ISOGG 2011	ISOGG 2012	ISOGG 2014
A-L1085	A0-T																			
A‑CTS2809.1, A‑L991.1, A‑V148	A0																			
A-P305	A1																			
A-M31	A1a	7	I	1A	1		H1	A	A1	A1	A1	A1a	A1	A1	A1a	A1a	A1a	A1a	A1a	
A-P108	A1b																			
A-L419	A1b1																			
A-L602	A1b1a																			
A-M14	A1b1a1																			
A-M6	A1b1a1a	27	I	2	3		H1	A	A2	A2	A2	A2	A2	A2	A2	A2	A2	A2	A1b1a1a	
A-P28	A1b1a1a1	27	I	2	4		H1	A	A2b	A2b	A2b	A2b	A2b	A2b	A2b	A2b	A2b	A2b	A1b1a1a1b	
A-L963	A1b1a1a2																			
A-M114	A1b1a1a2a	27	I	2	3		H1	A	A2a	A2a	A2a	A2a	A2a	A2a	A2a	A2a	A2a	A2a	A1b1a1a1a	
A-M32	A1b1b									A3	A3	A3	A3	A3	A3	A3	A3	A3	A1b1b	
A-M28	A1b1b1	7	I	1A	1		H1	A	A3a	A3a	A3a	A3a	A3a	A3a	A3a	A3a	A3a	A3a	A1b1b1	
A-M51	A1b1b2a	7	I	1A	1		H1	A	A3b1	A3b1	A3b1	A3b1	A3b1	A3b1	A3b1	A3b1	A3b1	A3b1	A1b1b2a	
A-M13	A1b1b2b	7	I	1A	2	Eu1	H1	A	A3b2	A3b2	A3b2	A3b2	A3b2	A3b2	A3b2	A3b2	A3b2	A3b2	A1b1b2b	
A-M171		7	I	1A	2		H1	A	A3b2a	A3b2a	A3b2a	A3b2a	A3b2a	A3b2a	A3b2a	A3b2a	A3b2a	A3b2a	removed	
A-M118	A1b1b2b1	7	I	1A	2		H1	A	A3b2b	A3b2b	A3b2b	A3b2b	A3b2b	A3b2b	A3b2b	A3b2b	A3b2b	A3b2b	A1b1b2b1	
A-V67	A1c~																			
A-M91	BT																			
B-M60		2	II	1B	5		H1	B	B	B	B	B	B	B	B	B	B	B	B	
B-M146		2	II	1B	5		H1	B	B1	B1	B1a	B1a	B1a	B1a	B1a	B1a	B1a	B1a	B1a	
B-M182										B2	B2	B2	B2	B2	B2	B2	B2	B2	B2	
B-M150		2	II	1B	5		H1	B	B2a	B2a	B2a	B2a	B2a	B2a	B2a	B2a	B2a	B2a	B2a	
B-M109		2	II	1B	5		H1	B	B2a1	B2a1	B2a1a	B2a1a	B2a1a	B2a1a	B2a1a	B2a1a	B2a1a	B2a1a	B2a1a	
B-M108.1		2	II	1B	5		H1	B	B2a2	B2a2	B2a2	B2a2	B2a2	B2a2	B2a2	B2a2	B2a2	removed		
B-M43		2	II	1B	5		H1	B	B2a2a	B2a2a	B2a2a	B2a2a	B2a2a	B2a2a	B2a2a	B2a2a	B2a2a	B2a2a	B2a2a	
B-M112		6	II	1B	6		H1	B	B2b	B2b	B2b	B2b	B2b	B2b	B2b	B2b	B2b	B2b	B2b	
B-P6		6	II	1B	7		H1	B	B2b1	B2b1	B2b1	B2b1	B2b1	B2b1	B2b1	B2b1	B2b1	B2b1	B2b1	
B-M115		6	II	1B	6		H1	B	B2b2	B2b2	B2b2	B2b2	B2b2	B2b2	B2b2	B2b2	B2b2	B2b2	B2b2	
B-M30		6	II	1B	6		H1	B	B2b3	B2b3	B2b3	B2b3	B2b3	B2b3	B2b3	B2b3	B2b3	B2b3	B2b3	
B-M108.2		6	II	1B	6		H1	B	B2b3a	B2b3a	B2b3a	B2b3a	B2b3a	B2b3a	B2b3a	B2b3a	B2b3a	removed		
B-P7		6	II	1B	8		H1	B	B2b4	B2b4	B2b4	B2b4	B2b4	B2b4	B2b4	B2b4	B2b4	removed		
B-P8		6	II	1B	10		H1	B	B2b4a	B2b4a	B2b4a	B2b4a	B2b4a	B2b4a	B2b4a	B2b4a	B2b4a	removed		
B-M211		6	II	1B	9		H1	B	B2b4b	B2b4b	B2b4b	B2b4b	B2b4b	B2b4b	B2b4b	B2b4b	B2b4b	B2b4b	B2b4b	
C-M216		10	V	1F	16	Eu6	H1	C	C	C	C	C	C	C	C	C	C	C	C	C
C-M8		10	V	1F	19		H1	C	C1	C1	C1	C1	C1	C1	C1	C1	C1	C1	C1	C1a1
C-M38		10	V	1F	16		H1	C	C2	C2	C2	C2	C2	C2	C2	C2	C2	C2	C2	C1b2
C-P33		10	V	1F	18		H1	C	C2a	C2a	C2a1	C2a1	C2a	C2a	C2a1	C2a1	C2a1	removed		
C-P44		10	V	1F	17		H1	C	C3	C3	C3	C3	C3	C3	C3	C3	C3	C3	C3	C2
C-M93		10	V	1F	17		H1	C	C3a	C3a	C3a	C3a	C3a	C3a	C3a	C3a	C3a	C3a	C3a1	C2a
C-M208		10	V	1F	17		H1	C	C3b	C2b	C2a	C2a	C2b	C2b	C2a	C2a	C2a	C2a	C2a	C1b2a
C-M210		36	V	1F	17		H1	C	C3c	C2c	C4a	C4a	C4b	C4b	C4a	C4a	C4a	C4a	C4a	C1c1
DE-YAP	DE								DE	DE	DE	DE	DE	DE	DE	DE	DE	DE	DE	DE
	DE*(xE)					Eu5			DE*(xE)	DE*(xE)	DE*(xE)	DE*(xE)	DE*(xE)	DE*(xE)	DE*(xE)	DE*(xE)	DE*(xE)	DE*(xE)	DE*(xE)	DE*(xE)
D-M174										D	D	D	D	D	D	D	D	D	D	D
D-M15		4	IV	3G	12		H3	B	D1	D1	D1	D1	D1	D1	D1	D1	D1	D1	D1	D1a
D-M55										D2	D2	D2	D2	D2	D2	D2	D2	D2	D2	D1b
D-P12		4	IV	3G	11		H2	B	D2a	D2a	D2a1a1	D2a1a1	D2	D2	D2a1a1	D2a1a1	D2a1a1	removed		D1b1a1a
D-M116.1		4	IV	3G	11		H2	B	D2b	D2a	D2a	D2a	D2a	D2a	D2a	D2a	D2a	removed		D1b1
D-M125		4	IV	3G	11		H2	B	D2b1	D2a1	D2a1	D2a1	D2a1	D2a1	D2a1	D2a1	D2a1	D2a1	D2a1	D1b1a
D-M151		4	IV	3G	11		H2	B	D2b2	D2a1	D2a2	D2a2	D2a2	D2a2	D2a2	D2a2	D2a2	D2a2	D2a2	D1b1b
						Eu3			E*(xE3a,E3b)	E*(xE3a,E3b)	E*(xE1b1,E1b1b1)	E*(xE1b1a,E1b1b1)	E*(xE3a,E3b1)	E*(xE3a,E3b1)	E*(E1b1a,E1b1b1)	E*(E1b1a,E1b1b1)	E*(E1b1a,E1b1b1)	E*(E1b1a,E1b1b1)		
E-P29		21	III	3A	13		H2	B	E	E	E	E	E	E	E	E	E	E	E	
E-M33		21	III	3A	13		H2	B	E1	E1	E1a	E1a	E1	E1	E1a	E1a	E1a	E1a	E1a	
E-M44		21	III	3A	13		H2	B	E1a	E1a	E1a1	E1a1	E1a	E1a	E1a1	E1a1	E1a1	E1a1	E1a1	
E-M75		21	III	3A	13		H2	B	E2a	E2	E2	E2	E2	E2	E2	E2	E2	E2	E2	
E-M54		21	III	3A	13		H2	B	E2b	E2b	E2b	E2b1								
E-P2		25	III	4	14		H2	B	E3	E3	E1b	E1b1	E3	E3	E1b1	E1b1	E1b1	E1b1	E1b1	
E-M2		8	III	5	15	Eu2	H2	B	E3a	E3a	E1b1	E1b1a	E3a	E3a	E1b1a	E1b1a	E1b1a	E1b1a1	E1b1a1	
E-M58		8	III	5	15		H2	B	E3a1	E3a1	E1b1a1	E1b1a1	E3a1	E3a1	E1b1a1	E1b1a1	E1b1a1	E1b1a1a1a	E1b1a1a1a	
E-M116.2		8	III	5	15		H2	B	E3a2	E3a2	E1b1a2	E1b1a2	E3a2	E3a2	E1b1a2	E1b1a2	E1ba12	removed		
E-M149		8	III	5	15		H2	B	E3a3	E3a3	E1b1a3	E1b1a3	E3a3	E3a3	E1b1a3	E1b1a3	E1b1a3	E1b1a1a1c	E1b1a1a1c	
E-M154		8	III	5	15		H2	B	E3a4	E3a4	E1b1a4	E1b1a4	E3a4	E3a4	E1b1a4	E1b1a4	E1b1a4	E1b1a1a1g1c	E1b1a1a1g1c	
E-M155		8	III	5	15		H2	B	E3a5	E3a5	E1b1a5	E1b1a5	E3a5	E3a5	E1b1a5	E1b1a5	E1b1a5	E1b1a1a1d	E1b1a1a1d	
E-M10		8	III	5	15		H2	B	E3a6	E3a6	E1b1a6	E1b1a6	E3a6	E3a6	E1b1a6	E1b1a6	E1b1a6	E1b1a1a1e	E1b1a1a1e	
E‑M35.1 formerly E‑M35 (Note: M35.1 (formerly just M35) and M35.2 are both single-nucleotide polymorphisms of base nr. 19579817, M35.1 is a G🡒C and M35.2 a C🡒T point mutation. To test for clade E1b1b1, position 19579817 must be tested for both M35.1 and M35.2 (i.e. for C or T). Testing negative for M35.1 without testing for M35.2 does not exclude membership in clade E1b1b1a1b1a3~ (unless the ancestral G‑polymorphism is explicitly confirmed). Thus old-tests for M35 tested for the paraphyletic group E1b1b1(xE1b1b1a1b1a3~) (ISOGG2019/20 clade names).)	E1b1b1(xE1b1b1a1b1a3~)	25	III	4	14	Eu4	H2	B	E3b	E3b	E1b1b1	E1b1b1	E3b1	E3b1	E1b1b1	E1b1b1	E1b1b1	E1b1b1(xE1b1b1a1b5)	E1b1b1(xE1b1b1a1b5)	E1b1b1(xE1b1b1a1b1a3)
E‑M35.1 ∨ E‑M35.2	E1b1b1																	E1b1b1	E1b1b1	E1b1b1
E-M35.2	E1b1b1a1b1a3~																	E1b1b1a1b5	E1b1b1a1b5	E1b1b1a1b1a3
E-M78		25	III	4	14		H2	B	E3b1	E3b1	E1b1b1a	E1b1b1a1	E3b1a	E3b1a	E1b1b1a	E1b1b1a	E1b1b1a	E1b1b1a1	E1b1b1a1	
E-M148		25	III	4	14		H2	B	E3b1a	E3b1a	E1b1b1a3a	E1b1b1a1c1	E3b1a3a	E3b1a3a	E1b1b1a3a	E1b1b1a3a	E1b1b1a3a	E1b1b1a1c1	E1b1b1a1c1	
E-M81		25	III	4	14		H2	B	E3b2	E3b2	E1b1b1b	E1b1b1b1	E3b1b	E3b1b	E1b1b1b	E1b1b1b	E1b1b1b	E1b1b1b1	E1b1b1b1a	
E-M107		25	III	4	14		H2	B	E3b2a	E3b2a	E1b1b1b1	E1b1b1b1a	E3b1b1	E3b1b1	E1b1b1b1	E1b1b1b1	E1b1b1b1	E1b1b1b1a	E1b1b1b1a1	
E-M165		25	III	4	14		H2	B	E3b2b	E3b2b	E1b1b1b2	E1b1b1b1b1	E3b1b2	E3b1b2	E1b1b1b2a	E1b1b1b2a	E1b1b1b2a	E1b1b1b2a	E1b1b1b1a2a	
E-M123		25	III	4	14		H2	B	E3b3	E3b3	E1b1b1c	E1b1b1c	E3b1c	E3b1c	E1b1b1c	E1b1b1c	E1b1b1c	E1b1b1c	E1b1b1b2a	
E-M34		25	III	4	14		H2	B	E3b3a	E3b3a	E1b1b1c1	E1b1b1c1	E3b1c1	E3b1c1	E1b1b1c1	E1b1b1c1	E1b1b1c1	E1b1b1c1	E1b1b1b2a1	
E-M136		25	III	4	14		H2	B	E3ba1	E3b3a1	E1b1b1c1a	E1b1b1c1a1	E3b1c1a	E3b1c1a	E1b1b1c1a1	E1b1b1c1a1	E1b1b1c1a1	E1b1b1c1a1	E1b1b1b2a1a1	
F-M89		2	VI	1R	20		H4	B	F	F	F	F	F	F	F	F	F	F	F	F
	F*(xI,J2,G,H1a,K)					Eu10			F*(xI,J2,G,H,K)	F*(xI,J2,G,H,K)	F*(xI,J2,G,H,K)	F*(xI,J2,G,H,K)	F*(xI,J2,G,H,K)	F*(xI,J2,G,H,K)	F*(xI,J2,G,H,K)	F*(xI,J2,G,H,K)	F*(xI,J2,G,H,K)	F*(xI,J2,G,H,K)	F*(xI,J2,G,H,K)	F*(xI,J2,G,H1,K)
H-APT		15	VI	1R	20		H4	B	F1	H2	H2	H2	H2	H2	H2	H2	H2	H2	H2	H1b1
G-M201	G	2	VI	1R	20	Eu11	H4	B	G	G	G	G	G	G	G	G	G	G	G	G
G-P20		2	VI	1R	20		H4	B	G1	G1a	G1a	G1a	G1a	G1a	G1a	G1a	G1a	G1a	G1a	
G-P15		2	VI	1Ha	22		H4	B	G2	G2	G2a	G2a	G2	G2	G2a	G2a	G2a	G2a	G2a	
G-P16		2	VI	1Hb	22		H4	B	G2a	G2a	G2a1	G2a1	G2a	G2a	G2a1	G2a1	G2a1	G2a1	G2a1a1	
G-P18		2	VI	1Hb	22		H4	B	G2a1	G2a1	G2a1a	G2a1a	G2a1	G2a1	G2a1a	G2a1a	G2a1a	G2a1a	G2a1a	
H-L901	H																			H
H-L902	H1																			
H-M69	H1a					Eu12			H	H	H	H	H	H	H	H	H	H	H	H1
H-M52	H1a1	35	VI	1R	20		H4	B	H	H1	H1	H1	H1	H1	H1	H1	H1	H1	H1	H1a
H-M82	H1a1a	35	VI	1R	20		H4	B	H1	H1a	H1a	H1a	H1a	H1a	H1a	H1a	H1a	H1a	H1a	H1a1
H-Z14668	H1a1a1																			H1a1a
H-M36	H1a1a1a	35	VI	1R	20		H4	B	H1a	H1a1	H1a1	H1a1	H1a1	H1a1	H1a1	H1a1	H1a1	H1a1	H1a1	H1a1a1
H-M97	H1a1a2~	35	VI	1R	20		H4	B	H1b	H1a2	H1a2	H1a2	H1a2	H1a2	H1a2	H1a2	H1a2	H1a2	H1a2	H1a1b
H-M39	H1a1a3~	35	VI	1R	21		H4	B	H1c	H1a3	H1a3	H1a3	H1a3	H1a3	H1a3	H1a3	H1a3	H1a3	H1a3	H1a1c
I-M170	I	2	VI	1R	21		H4	B	I	I	I	I	I	I	I	I	I	I	I	I
						Eu7			I*(xI1b2)	I*(xI1b2)	I*(xI2a2)	I*(xI2a1)			I*(xI2a1)					
I-P38		2	VI	1R	21		H4	B	I1	I1	I	I	I1	I1	I	I	I	I	I	
I-P30		2	VI	1R	21		H4	B	I1a	I1a	I1	I1	I1a	I1a	I1	I1	I1	I1	I1	
I-P40		2	VI	1R	21		H4	B	I1a1	I1a1	I1	I1	I1a	I1a	I1	I1	I1	I1	I1	
I-M21		2	VI	1R	21		H4	B	I1a2	I1a2	I1a	I1a	I1a2	I1a2	I1a	I1a	I1a	I1a	removed	
I-M72		2	VI	1R	21		H4	B	I1a3	I1a3	I1b1	I1b1	I1a3	I1a1a	I1b1	I1b1	I1b1	I1b1	I1b1a	
I-P37.2		2	VI	1R	21		H4	B	I1b	I1b	I2a	I2a						I2a1	I2a1	
I-P41.2		2	VI	1R	21		H4	B	I1b1	I1b1	I2a1	I2a2a						I2a1b1	I2a1b1	
I-M26		2	VI	1R	21	Eu8	H4	B	I1b2	I1b2	I2a2	I2a1			I2a1					
I-M161		2	VI	1R	21		H4	B	I1b2a	I1b2a	I2a2a	I2a1a								
J-12f2a		9	VI	Med	23		H4	B	J	J	J	J								
J-M62		9	VI	Med	23		H4	B	J1	J1a	J1a	J1a								
J-M172	J2	9	VI	Med	24	Eu9	H4	B	J2	J2	J2	J2	J2	J2	J2	J2	J2	J2	J2	J2
J-M47		9	VI	Med	24		H4	B	J2a	J2a	J2a1	J2a4a								
J-M68		9	VI	Med	24		H4	B	J2b	J2b	J2a3	J2a4c								
J-M137		9	VI	Med	24		H4	B	J2c	J2c	J2a4	J2a4h2a1								
J-M158		9	VI	Med	24		H4	B	J2d	J2d	J2a5	J2a4h1								
J-M12		9	VI	Med	24		H4	B	J2e	J2e	J2b	J2b								
J-M102		9	VI	Med	24		H4	B	J2e1	J2e1	J2b	J2b								
J-M99		9	VI	Med	24		H4	B	J2e1a	J2e1a	J2b2a	J2b2a								
J-M67		9	VI	Med	24		H4	B	J2f	J2f	J2a2	J2a4b								
J-M92		9	VI	Med	24		H4	B	J2f1	J2f1	J2a2a	J2a4b1								
J-M163		9	VI	Med	24		H4	B	J2f2	J2f2	J2a2b	J2a4b2								
K-M9	K	26	VIII	1U	25		H5	F	K	K	K	K	K	K	K	K	K	K	K	K
	K*(xT1a,N1a1,L,P)					Eu16			K*(xK2,N3,L,P)	K*(xK2,N3,L,P)	K*(xT,N1c,L,P)	K*(xT1,N1c,L,P)	K*(xK2,N3,L,P)	K*(xK2,N3,L,P)	K*(xT,N1c,L,P)					
M-SRY9138		23	VIII	1E	25		H5	F	K1	K1	M2a	M2a								
T-M70	T1a	26	VIII	1U	25	Eu15	H5	F	K2	K2	T	T1	K2	K2	T	T	T	T1	T1a	T1a
K-M147		26	VIII	1U	25		H5	F	K3	K3	K1	K1	K3	K3	K1	K1	K1	K1	removed	K2e
S-B254	S																			
S-B255	S1																			
S-Z41335	S1a																			
S-Z42413	S1a1																			
S-Z41513	S1a1a																			
S-M230	S1a1b												K5	K5	S	S	S	S	S	S
L-M20	L	28	VIII	1U	27	Eu17	H5	F	L	L	L	L	L	L	L	L	L	L	L	L
L-M27		28	VIII	1U	27		H5	F	L1	L1	L1	L1								
L-L595	L2	28	VIII	1U	27		H5	F	L*	L*	L*	L*	L*	L*	L*	L*	L*	L2	L2	L2
M-M4		24	VIII	1U	37		H17	E	M	M	M1	M1								
M-P34		24	VIII	1U	37		H17	E	M1	M1	M1a	M1a								
M-P22		24	VIII	1U	38		H17	E	M2	M2a	M1b1	M1b1								
M-M16		24	VIII	1U	39		H17	E	M2a	M2a1	M1b1a	M1b1a								
M-M83		24	VIII	1U	38		H17	E	M2b	M2a2	M1b1b	M1b1b								
N-M231	N																			
N-M2183	N1																			
N-M2013	N1a																			
N-LLY22g	removed	12	VIII	1U	25		H5	F	N*	N	N1	N1								
N-L666	N1a2																			
N-M128	N1a2a	12	VIII	1U	25		H5	F	N1	N1	N1a	N1a								
N-B523	N1a2b																			
N-P63	N1a2b1	12	VIII	1U	25		H5	F	N2	N2a	N1b1	N1b1								
N-TAT, N-M46	N1a1	12	VIII	1I	26		H5	F	N3	N3	N1c	N1c	N3	N3	N1c					
	N3*(xN1a1a)					Eu13			N3*	N3*(xN3a)	N1c*(xN1c1)	N1c*(xN1c1)	N3*(xN3a)	N3*(xN3a)	N1c*(xN1c1)					
N-M178	N1a1a	16	VIII	1I	26	Eu14	H5	F	N3a	N3a	N1c1	N1c1	N3a	N3a	N1c1					
N-P21	not incl.	16	VIII	1I	26		H5	F	N3a1	N3a1	N1c1a	N1c1a	N3a1							
O-M175		26	VII	1U	28		H9	I	O	O	O	O	O	O	O	O	O	O	O	
O-M119		26	VII	1U	32		H9	H	O1	O1a	O1a	O1a	O1a	O1a	O1a	O1a	O1a	O1a	O1a	
O-M101		26	VII	1U	32		H9	H	O1a	O1a1	O1a1a	O1a1a	O1a1	O1a1	O1a1a	O1a1a	O1a1a	O1a1a	O1a1a	
O-M50		26	VII	1U	32		H10	H	O1b	O1a2	O1a2	O1a2	O1a2	O1a2	O1a2	O1a2	O1a2	O1a2	O1a2	
O-P31		26	VII	1U	33		H5	I	O2	O2	O2	O2	O2	O2	O2	O2	O2	O2	O2	O2
O-M95		26	VII	1U	34		H11	G	O2a	O2a	O2a	O2a	O2a	O2a	O2a	O2a	O2a	O2a1	O2a1	O2a1
O-M88		26	VII	1U	34		H12	G	O2a1	O2a1	O2a1	O2a1	O2a1	O2a1	O2a1	O2a1	O2a1	O2a1a	O2a1a	O2a1a
O-SRY465		20	VII	1U	35		H5	I	O2b	O2b	O2b	O2b	O2b	O2b	O2b	O2b	O2b	O2b	O2b	O2b
O-47z		5	VII	1U	26		H5	I	O2b1	O2b1a	O2b1	O2b1	O2b1a	O2b1a	O2b1	O2b1	O2b1	O2b1	O2b1	O2b1a
O-M122		26	VII	1U	29		H6	L	O3	O3	O3	O3	O3	O3	O3	O3	O3	O3	O3	O3
O-M121		26	VII	1U	29		H6	L	O3a	O3a	O3a1	O3a1	O3a1	O3a1	O3a1	O3a1	O3a1	O3a1a	O3a1a	O3a1a
O-M164		26	VII	1U	29		H6	L	O3b	O3b	O3a2	O3a2	O3a2	O3a2	O3a2	O3a2	O3a2	O3a1b	O3a1b	O3a1b
O-M159		13	VII	1U	31		H6	L	O3c	O3c	O3a3a	O3a3a	O3a3	O3a3	O3a3a	O3a3a	O3a3a	O3a3a	O3a3a	O3a2a
O-M7		26	VII	1U	29		H7	L	O3d	O3c	O3a3b	O3a3b	O3a4	O3a4	O3a3b	O3a3b	O3a3b	O3a2b	O3a2b	O3a2b
O-M113		26	VII	1U	29		H7	L	O3d1	O3c1	O3a3b1	O3a3b1		O3a4a	O3a3b1	O3a3b1	O3a3b1	O3a2b1	O3a2b1	O3a2b1
O-M134		26	VII	1U	30		H8	L	O3e	O3d	O3a3c	O3a3c	O3a5	O3a5	O3a3c	O3a3c	O3a3c	O3a2c1	O3a2c1	O3a2c1
O-M117		26	VII	1U	30		H8	L	O3e1	O3d1	O3a3c1	O3a3c1	O3a5a	O3a5a	O3a3c1	O3a3c1	O3a3c1	O3a3c1	O3a2c1a	O3a2c1a
O-M162		26	VII	1U	30		H8	L	O3e1a	O3d1a	O3a3c1a	O3a3c1a	O3a5a1	O3a5a1	O3a3c1a	O3a3c1a	O3a3c1a	removed		
P-P295	P																			P
P-PF5845	P1																			
P-M45	P1a	1	X	1C	40		H14		P	P	P	P	P	P	P	P	P	P	P	P1
	P*(xR1,Q1b1a1a,R2a)					Eu20			P*(xR1,Q3,P1)	P*(xR1,Q3,R2)	P*(xR1,Q1a3a,R2)	P*(xR1,Q1a3a1,R2)	P*(xR1,Q3,R2)							
R-M124	R2a	1	X	1C	40	Eu21	H14		P1	R2	R2	R2	R2	R2	R2	R2	R2a	R2a	R2a	R2a
Q-P36		1	X	1C	40		H14		Q	Q	Q1	Q1	Q	Q	Q1	Q1	Q1	Q1	Q1	Q1
Q-M120		1	X	1C	40		H13		Q1	Q1	Q1a1	Q1a1	Q1	Q1	Q1a1	Q1a1	Q1a1	Q1a1	Q1a1	Q1a1a1
Q-M25		1	X	1C	40		H14		Q2	Q2	Q1a2	Q1a2	Q2	Q2	Q1a2	Q1a2	Q1a2	Q1a2	Q1a2	Q1a1b
Q-M3	Q1b1a1a	18	X	1G	41	Eu22	H15		Q3	Q3	Q1a3a	Q1a3a1	Q3	Q3	Q1a3a	Q1a3a	Q1a3a1	Q1a3a1	Q1a3a1	Q1a2a1a1
Q-M19		18	X	1G	41		H15		Q3a	Q3a	Q1a3a1	Q1a3a1a	Q3a	Q3a	Q1a3a1	Q1a3a1	Q1a3a1a	Q1a3a1a	Q1a3a1a	Q1a2a1a1a
Q-M194		18	X	1G	41		H15		Q3b	Q3b	Q1a3a2	Q1a3a1b	Q3b	Q3b	Q1a3a2	Q1a3a2	Q1a3a1b	Q1a3a1a	Q1a3a1a	Q1a2a1a1b
Q-M199		18	X	1G	41		H15		Q3c	Q3c	Q1a3a3	Q1a3a1c	Q3c	Q3c	Q1a3a3	Q1a3a3	Q1a3a1c	Q1a3a1c	Q1a3a1c	Q1a2a1a1c
R-M207	R	1	IX	1C	42		H14	D	R	R	R	R	R	R	R	R	R	R	R	R
R-M173	R1	1	IX	1C	43		H14	D	R1	R1	R1	R1	R1	R1	R1	R1	R1	R1	R1	R1
	R1*(xR1a1a)					Eu18			R1*(xR1a1)	R1*(xR1a1)	R1*(xR1a1)	R1*(xR1a1a)	R1*(xR1a1)	R1*(xR1a1)	R1*(xR1a1a)	R1*(xR1a1a)	R1*(xR1a1a)	R1*(xR1a1a)	R1*(xR1a1a)	R1*(xR1a1a)
R-M420, R-L62, R-M513	R1a											R1a			R1a	R1a	R1a	R1a	R1a	R1a
R-M459, R-SRY10831.2	R1a1	29	IX	1C	45		H14	D	R1a	R1a	R1a	R1a1	R1a	R1a	R1a1	R1a1	R1a1	R1a1	R1a1	R1a1
R-M17	R1a1a	3	IX	1D	45	Eu19	H16	D	R1a1	R1a1	R1a1	R1a1a	R1a1	R1a1	R1a1a	R1a1a	R1a1a	R1a1a	R1a1a	R1a1a
R-M343	R1b										R1b		R1b	R1b	R1b	R1b	R1b	R1b	R1b	R1b
R-P25		1	IX	1L	44		H14	D	R1b	R1b	R1b1	R1b1	R1b1	R1b1	R1b1	R1b1	R1b1	removed		
R-L754	R1b1																			
R-L388	R1b1a																			
R-M73	R1b1a1a	1	IX	1L	44		H14	D	R1b4	R1b1b	R1b1b1	R1b1a1	R1b1b	R1b1b	R1b1b1	R1b1b1	R1b1b1	R1b1a1	R1b1a1	R1b1a1
R-M269	R1b1a1b										R1b1b2		R1b1c	R1b1c	R1b1b2	R1b1b2	R1b1b2	R1b1a2	R1b1a2	R1b1a2
R‑L23, R‑S141, R‑PF6534	R1b1a1b1																			
R‑L51, R‑M412	R1b1a1b1a																			
R-P310	R1b1a1b1a1																			
R-L151	R1b1a1b1a1a																			
R‑M405, R‑U106	R1b1a1b1a1a1																			
R‑P312, R‑S116	R1b1a1b1a1a2																			
R‑DF27, R‑S250	R1b1a1b1a1a2a																			
R-M153	R1b1a1b1a1a2a1a1a1a1	1	IX	1L	44		H14	D	R1b6	R1b1c4	R1b1b2c	R1b1a2a1a1b2	R1b1c4	R1b1c4	R1b1b2a1b2	R1b1b2a1a2b	R1b1b2a1a2b	R1b1a2a1a1b2a	R1b1a2a1a1b1a1a1a	R1b1a2a1a2a1a1a1a1
R-SRY2627, M-167	R1b1a1b1a1a2a1b1a1	22	IX	1L	44		H14	D	R1b8	R1b1c6	R1b1b2d	R1b1a2a1a1b5a	R1b1c6	R1b1c6	R1b1b2a1b3	R1b1b2a1a2c	R1b1b2a1a2c	R1b1a2a1a1b2b1	R1b1a2a1a1b1a2a1	R1b1a2a1a2a1b1a1
R‑S28, R‑U152	R1b1a1b1a1a2b																			
R‑S461, R‑Z290	R1b1a1b1a1a2c																			
R‑L21, R‑M529, R‑S145	R1b1a1b1a1a2c1																			
R‑Z2103, R‑CTS1078	R1b1a1b1b																			
R-PF7558	R1b1a1b2																			
R-GG480, R-PF7563	R1b1a1b2a																			
R‑V88, R‑PF6279	R1b1b																			
R-M18	R1b1b1	1	IX	1L	44		H14	D	R1b1	R1b1a	R1b1a	R1b1c	R1b1a	R1b1a	R1b1a	R1b1a	R1b1a	R1b1c1	R1b1c1	R1b1c1
R-PH155	R1b2																			
R‑M479, R‑PF6107	R2																			
R-M124	R2a																			
R-FGC21706	R2b																			
R-M56		3	IX	1D	45		H16	D	R1a1a	R1a1a	R1a1a	R1a1a1a	R1a1a	R1a1a	R1a1a1	R1a1a1	R1a1a1a	R1a1a1a	removed	
R-M157.1		3	IX	1D	45		H16	D	R1a1b	R1a1b	R1a1b	R1a1a1b	R1a1b	R1a1b	R1a1a2	R1a1a2	R1a1a1b	R1a1a1b	removed	
R-M87		3	IX	1D	45		H16	D	R1a1c	R1a1c	R1a1c	R1a1a1c	R1a1c	R1a1c	R1a1a3	R1a1a3	R1a1a1c	R1a1a1c	removed	
R-M37		1	IX	1L	44		H14	D	R1b2	R1b1c1	R1b1b2a	R1b1a2a1a1b4a	R1b1c1	R1b1c1	R1b1b2a1b6a	R1b1b2a1a2f1	R1b1b2a1a2f1	R1b1a2a1a1b4a	removed	
R-M65		1	IX	1L	44		H14	D	R1b3	R1b1c2	R1b1b2b	R1b1a2a1a1b1	R1b1c2	R1b1c2	R1b1b2a1b1	R1b1b2a1a2a	R1b1b2a1a2a	R1b1a2a1a1b1	removed	
R-M126		1	IX	1L	44		H14	D	R1b5	R1b1c3	R1b1b2h1	R1b1a2a1a1b3a	R1b1c3	R1b1c3	R1b1b2a1b4a	R1b1b2a1a2d1	R1b1b2a1a2d1	R1b1a2a1a1b3a	removed	
R-M160		1	IX	1L	44		H14	D	R1b7	R1b1c5	R1b1b2h2	R1b1a2a1a1b3b	R1b1c5	R1b1c5	R1b1b2a1b4b	R1b1b2a1a2d2	R1b1b2a1a2d2	R1b1a2a1a1b3b	removed	

=== Original research publications ===
The following research teams per their publications were represented in the creation of the YCC Tree.

- α Jobling & Tyler-Smith 2000 and Kaladjieva 2001
- β Underhill 2000
- γ Hammer 2001
- δ Karafet 2001
- ε Semino 2000
- ζ Su 1999
- η Capelli 2001

== See also ==
=== Genetics ===
- African admixture in Europe
- Genetic genealogy
- Haplogroup
- Haplotype
- Human Y-chromosome DNA haplogroup
- International Society of Genetic Genealogy
- Molecular phylogenetics
- Paragroup
- Subclade
- Y-chromosome haplogroups in populations of the world
- Y-DNA haplogroups by ethnic group
- Y-DNA haplogroups in populations of Sub-Saharan Africa

=== Y-DNA haplogroups and subclades ===
- Haplogroup A-V148 (Y-DNA)
- Haplogroup B-M42 (Y-DNA)
- Haplogroup B-M60 (Y-DNA)
- Haplogroup CF (Y-DNA)
- Haplogroup C-M130 (Y-DNA)
- Haplogroup C-M217 (Y-DNA)
- Haplogroup CT (Y-DNA)
- Haplogroup DE (Y-DNA)
- Haplogroup D-M15 (Y-DNA)
- Haplogroup D-M174 (Y-DNA)
- Haplogroup E-M123 (Y-DNA)
- Haplogroup E-M215 (Y-DNA)
- Haplogroup E-M33 (Y-DNA)
- Haplogroup E-M75 (Y-DNA)
- Haplogroup E-M96 (Y-DNA)
- Haplogroup E-P147 (Y-DNA)
- Haplogroup E-P177 (Y-DNA)
- Haplogroup E-P2 (Y-DNA)
- Haplogroup E-V38 (Y-DNA)
- Haplogroup E-V68 (Y-DNA)
- Haplogroup E-Z827 (Y-DNA)
- Haplogroup F-L15 (Y-DNA)
- Haplogroup F-M89 (Y-DNA)
- Haplogroup G-L293 (Y-DNA)
- Haplogroup G-M201 (Y-DNA)
- Haplogroup G-M285 (Y-DNA)
- Haplogroup G-M377 (Y-DNA)
- Haplogroup G-M406 (Y-DNA)
- Haplogroup G-P303 (Y-DNA)
- Haplogroup H-M69 (Y-DNA)
- Haplogroup IJ (Y-DNA)
- Haplogroup I-M170 (Y-DNA)
- Haplogroup I-M253 (Y-DNA)
- Haplogroup I-M438 (Y-DNA)
- Haplogroup J-M172 (Y-DNA)
- Haplogroup J-M267 (Y-DNA)
- Haplogroup J-P209 (Y-DNA)
- Haplogroup K-M526 (Y-DNA)
- Haplogroup K-M9 (Y-DNA)
- Haplogroup L-M20 (Y-DNA)
- Haplogroup M-P256 (Y-DNA)
- Haplogroup N-M231 (Y-DNA)
- Haplogroup NO (Y-DNA)
- Haplogroup O-M122 (Y-DNA)
- Haplogroup O-M175 (Y-DNA)
- Haplogroup O-M176 (Y-DNA)
- Haplogroup O-M95 (Y-DNA)
- Haplogroup O-MSY2.2 (Y-DNA)
- Haplogroup O-P31 (Y-DNA)
- Haplogroup P-M45 (Y-DNA)
- Haplogroup Q-L275 (Y-DNA)
- Haplogroup Q-L53 (Y-DNA)
- Haplogroup Q-L54 (Y-DNA)
- Haplogroup Q-M120 (Y-DNA)
- Haplogroup Q-M242 (Y-DNA)
- Haplogroup Q-M25 (Y-DNA)
- Haplogroup Q-M3 (Y-DNA)
- Haplogroup Q-M323 (Y-DNA)
- Haplogroup Q-M346 (Y-DNA)
- Haplogroup Q-NWT01 (Y-DNA)
- Haplogroup Q-P89.1 (Y-DNA)
- Haplogroup Q-Z780 (Y-DNA)
- Haplogroup R1b (Y-DNA)
- Haplogroup R-L295 (Y-DNA)
- Haplogroup R-M124 (Y-DNA)
- Haplogroup R-M167 (Y-DNA)
- Haplogroup R-M17 (Y-DNA)
- Haplogroup R-M173 (Y-DNA)
- Haplogroup R-M207 (Y-DNA)
- Haplogroup R-M420 (Y-DNA)
- Haplogroup R-M479 (Y-DNA)
- Haplogroup S-M230 (Y-DNA)
- Haplogroup T-M184 (Y-DNA)
