= Haplogroup Q-L804 (Y-DNA) =

Human Y-chromosome DNA haplogroup

- Possible time of origin: 3,000-15,000 years ago
- Possible place of origin: Beringia, East Asia, North Asia
- Ancestor: Q-L54
- Descendants: Q-Y9052, Q-A13540, Q-JN15, Q-Y16137, Q-Y7582
- Defining mutations: L804 (rs1952836)

Haplogroup Q-L804 (Y-DNA) is a Y-chromosome DNA haplogroup. Haplogroup Q-L804 is a subclade of Haplogroup Q-L54. Currently Q-L804 is Q1b1a1b below Q1b-M346.

In 2000 the research group at Oxford University headed by Dr. Agnar Helgason first discovered the haplotype that was much later to become known as Q-L804. In 2000 the strange haplotype was called "branch-A" (i.e. R1b-branch A) and it was found uniquely on Iceland and Scandinavia. Later studies completed the genetic bridge by determining that Q-L804 is related to Q-M242 populations of Native Americans (Q-M3, Q-Z780) and Siberian populations of the Selkup and Ket people (Q-L330).

== Origin and distribution ==
The origin of Haplogroup Q-L804 is uncertain. However it is likely to have originated in Beringia (North East Siberia) c. 15000 to 17000 yBP since it is closely linked to Q-M3 and to other haplogroups linked to the indigenous peoples of the Americas (over 90% of indigenous people in Meso & South America). Today, Q-L804 is found mainly in Norway and Sweden and in regions of North West Europe of Viking Age Expansion (British Isles, Atlantic Isles, Northern Germany, Normandy and Poland). The Q-L804 is also found among descendants of Scandinavian immigrants to North America. Haplogroup Q-L804 is defined by the presence of the (L804) single-nucleotide polymorphism (SNP). Q-L804 occurred on the Q-L54 lineage roughly 10-15 thousand years ago as the migration into the Americas was underway. It is likely that the split between Q-M3 and Q-L804 happened in the ancestors of the indigenous peoples of the Americas.

=== North Europe ===
Populations carrying Q-L804 are extremely thinly distributed throughout Northern Europe and among recent North European immigrants to North America. Since the discovery and definition of Q-L804 in 2014, three main subclades of Q-L804 bearing populations have been discovered in North Europe. The Q-Y9052 , the Q-JN14 and Q-Y7582. Of these three branches Q-JN14 has the widest distribution, ranging from Poland to Iceland, British Isles and France. Q-L804 is one of two subclades known as Q Nordic among genealogical communities. The Q-L527 is the other subclad of the Q Nordic.

=== Subclade distribution ===
Q-Y9052 (BY459). This lineage is found in Sweden, Norway and Germany.

Q-JN14 It has been found in Norway, Iceland, British Isles, Germany, France and Poland.

Q-Y7582 (BY386). This lineage has been found in Scotland, Iceland and England.

== Technical specification of mutation ==
The L804 was discovered and defined by Thomas Krahn of Family Tree DNA's Genomics Research Center in 2012. The technical details of L804 are:

Nucleotide change: T to A
Position (base pair):
Total size (base pairs):
Forward 5′→ 3′: GAATTCTGTGGGTGACTTTGTG
Reverse 5′→ 3′: GCACAGTGAAGAATGTGGGAC
Position: chrY:11,907,522
dbSNP151: rs765685783

== Associated SNPs ==
Q-L804 is defined by the SNPs L804 and L805 and E324.

== Phylogentic tree and Subgroups ==
Current status of the polygenetic tree for Q-L804 is published by Pinotti et al. in the article Y Chromosome Sequences Reveal a Short Beringian Standstill, Rapid Expansion, and early Population structure of Native American Founders. Calibrated phylogeny of Y haplogroup Q-L804 and its relation to the other branches of Q-L54.

- Q-L54
  - Q-L330
  - Q-MPB001 (18.9 kya)
    - Q-CTS1780
    - Q-M930
      - Q-L804
      - Q-M3 (15.0 kya)
        - Q-Y4308
        - Q-M848 (14.9 kya)

Yfull.com's phylogenetic tree ver. 6.08.01 for for haplogroup Q-L804. Yfull's tree also include estimation of the age of the branches, and TMRCA (Time to Most Recent Common Ancestor)

- Q > Q-L472 > Q-L56 > Q-L53 > Q-L54 > Q-M1107 > Q-M930
  - Q-L804 formed 15200 ybp, TMRCA 3200 yBP
    - Q-Y9052 formed 3200 ybp, TMRCA 3200 yBP
      - Q-Y9294 formed 3200 ybp, TMRCA 2800 ybp
        - Q-YP5210
        - Q-Y9048
    - Q-A13540 formed 3200 ybp, TMRCA 2900 yBP
      - Q-JN15 formed 2900 ybp, TMRCA 1650 yBP
        - Q-Y16137
      - Q-Y7582 formed 2900 ybp, TMRCA 1650 yBP
        - Q-Y38488
        - Q-Y12445
        - Q-Y15622

Family Tree DNA Y-DNA haplotree for haplogroup Q-L804

- Q (M242) > Q-MEH2 > Q-M346 > Q-L53 > Q-L54 > Q-CTS3814 > Q-CTS11969
  - Q-L804
    - Q-BY387
      - Q-PH2487
      - Q-Y38488
    - Q-JN14
      - Q-Y16137
      - Q-BY66620
    - Q-BY459
      - Q-Y9291

The subtree Q-BY387 is found on Iceland, Scotland and England. The Q-JN14 is widely distributed in North-west Europe, but most kits are from Norway. The subtree Q-BY459 is by FT DNA mainly found in Sweden and Norway.

== See also ==
- Human Y-chromosome DNA haplogroup

=== Y-DNA Q-M242 subclades ===
- Q-M242
- Q-L275
- Q-L330
- Q-L717
- Q-L940
- Q-L53
- Q-L54
- Q-L804
- Q-M120
- Q-M25
- Q-M3
- Q-M346
- Q-NWT01
- Q-P89.1
- Q-Z780
