= Genetic history of the Indigenous peoples of the Americas =

Genetics on the peopling of the Americas

The genetic history of the Indigenous peoples of the Americas is divided into two distinct periods: the initial peopling of the Americas from about 20,000 to 14,000 years ago (20–14 kya), and European contact after, about 500 years ago. The first period of the genetic history of Indigenous Americans is the determinant factor for the number of genetic lineages, zygosity mutations, and founding haplotypes present in today's Indigenous American populations.

Indigenous American populations descend from an Ancient East Asian lineage which diverged from other East Asian peoples prior to the Last Glacial Maximum (26–18 kya). They also received geneflow from Ancient North Eurasians, a distinct Paleolithic Siberian population with deep affinities to both "European hunter-gatherers" (e.g. Kostenki-14) and "Basal East Asians" (e.g. Tianyuan man). They later dispersed throughout the Americas after about 16,000 years ago (exceptions being the Na-Dene and Eskimo–Aleut speaking groups, which are derived partially from Siberian populations which entered the Americas at a later time).

Analyses of genetics among Indigenous American and Siberian populations have been used to argue for early isolation of founding populations on Beringia and for later, more rapid migration from Siberia through Beringia into the New World. The microsatellite diversity and distributions of the Y lineage specific to South America indicates that certain Indigenous American populations have been isolated since the initial peopling of the region. The Na-Dene, Inuit and Native Alaskan populations exhibit Y-DNA haplogroup Q; however, they are distinct from other Indigenous Americans with various mtDNA and atDNA mutations. This suggests that the peoples who first settled in the northern extremes of North America and Greenland derived from later migrant populations than those who penetrated farther south in the Americas. Linguists and biologists have reached a similar conclusion based on analysis of Indigenous American language groups and ABO blood group system distributions.

== Autosomal DNA ==
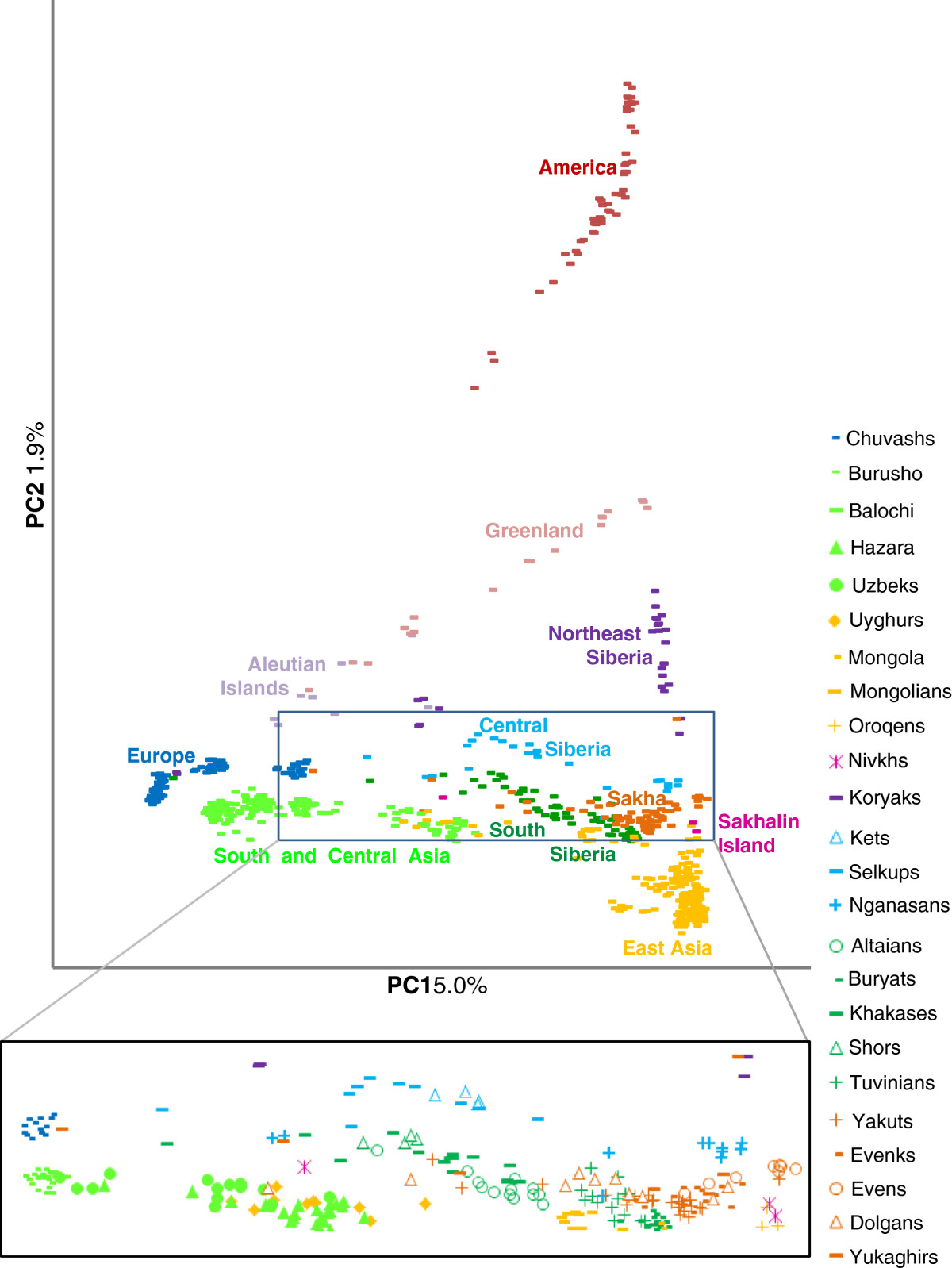
Principal component analysis showing the Native American cluster in other Eurasian populations.

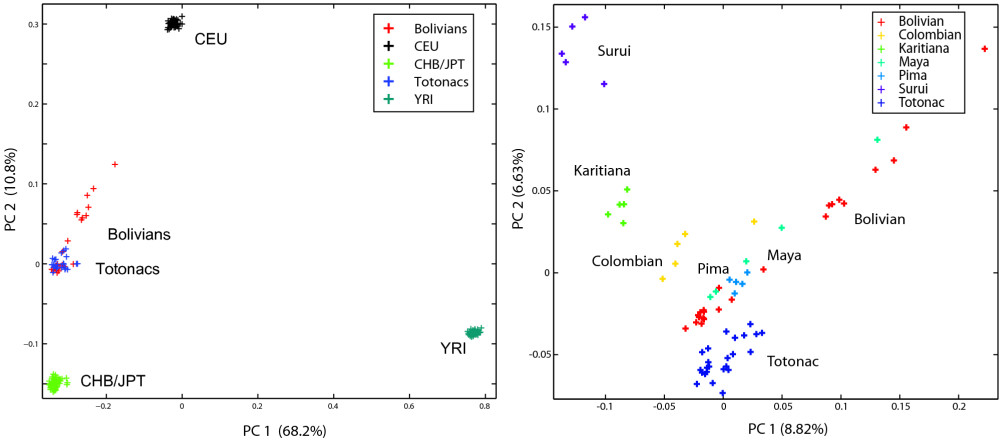
Position of Native Americans on a Principal component analysis of global human population clusters from the 1000 Genomes project.

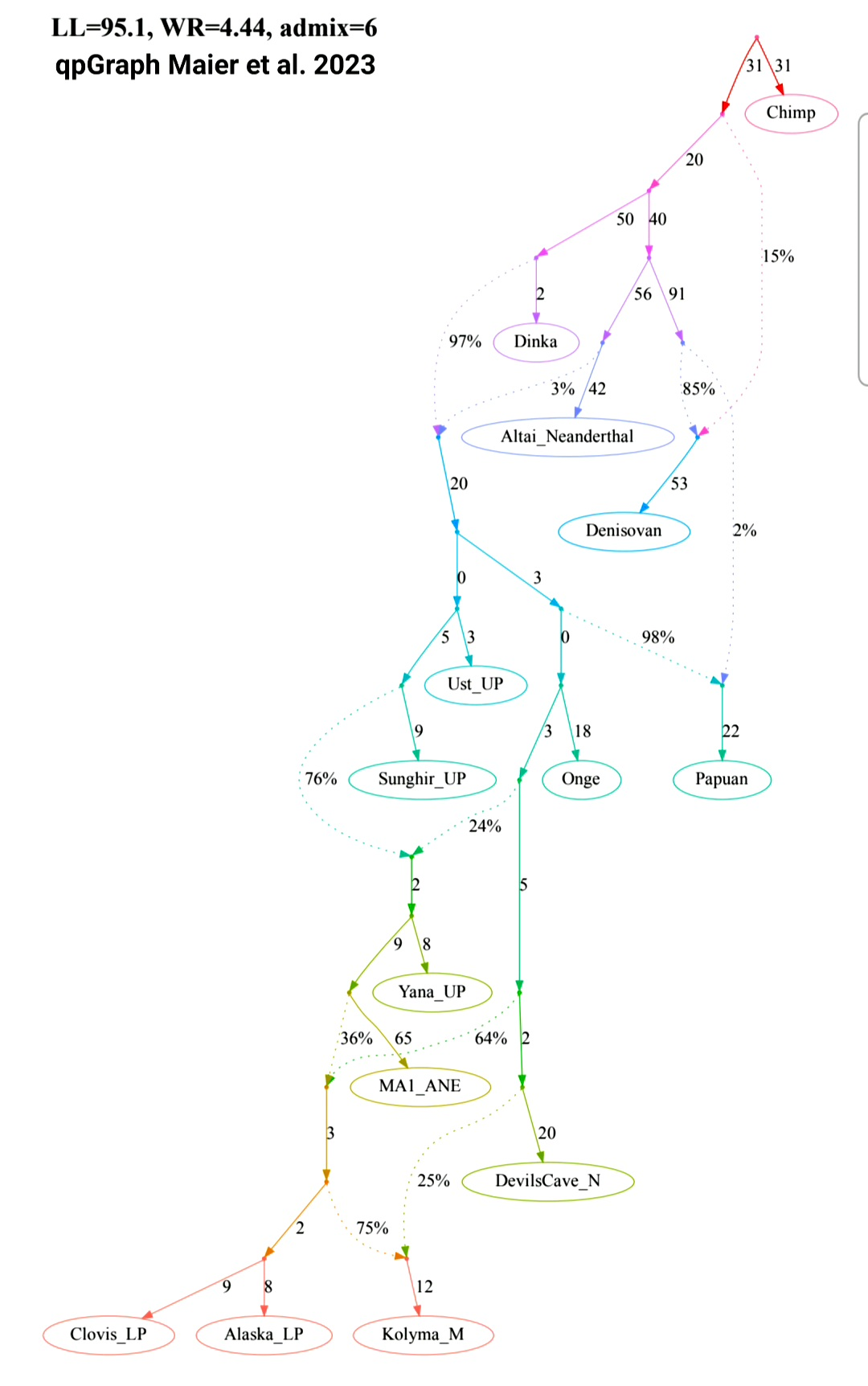
A qpGraph on the formation of Ancient Paleo-Siberians and Native American populations.

Genetic diversity and population structure in the American landmass is also measured using autosomal (atDNA) micro-satellite markers genotyped; sampled from North, Central, and South America and analyzed against similar data available from other Indigenous populations worldwide. The Indigenous American populations show a lesser genetic diversity than populations from other continental regions, while their overall strongest affinity for other populations is observed for Paleosiberian peoples. Observed is a decreasing genetic diversity as geographic distance from the Bering Strait occurs, as well as a decreasing genetic similarity to Siberian populations from Alaska (the genetic entry point). Also observed is evidence of a greater level of diversity and lesser level of population structure in western South America compared to eastern South America. There is a relative lack of differentiation between Mesoamerican and Andean populations, a scenario that implies that coastal routes (in this case along the coast of the Pacific Ocean) were easier for migrating peoples (more genetic contributors) to traverse in comparison with inland routes.

The overall pattern suggests that the Americas were colonized by a small number of individuals (effective size of about 70), which grew by many orders of magnitude over 800 – 1000 years. The data also shows that there have been genetic exchanges between Asia, the Arctic, and Greenland since the initial peopling of the Americas.

According to an autosomal genetic study from 2012, Indigenous Americans descend from at least three main migrant waves from Northern Asia. Most of it is traced back to a single ancestral population, called 'First Americans'. However, those who speak Inuit languages from the Arctic inherited almost half of their ancestry from a second East Asian migrant wave, and those who speak Na-Dene inherited a tenth of their ancestry from a third migrant wave. The initial settling of the Americas was followed by a rapid expansion southwards along the west coast, with little gene flow later, especially in South America. One exception to this are the Chibcha speakers of Colombia, whose ancestry comes from both North and South America.

In 2014, the autosomal DNA of a 12,500+ year old infant from Montana was sequenced. The DNA was taken from a skeleton referred to as Anzick-1, found in close association with several Clovis artifacts. Comparisons showed strong affinities with DNA from Siberian sites, and virtually ruled out that particular individual had any close affinity with European sources (the "Solutrean hypothesis"). The DNA also showed strong affinities with all existing Indigenous American populations, which indicated that all of them derive from an ancient population that lived in or near Siberia.

Two 2015 autosomal DNA genetic studies confirmed the Siberian origins of the Indigenous peoples of the Americas. However, an ancient signal of shared ancestry with Australasians (Indigenous peoples of Australia, Melanesia, and the Andaman Islands) was detected among the Indigenous peoples of the Amazon region. This signal, also dubbed as 'population Y' has been more recently linked to a deep East Asian population, which can be associated with the Tianyuan man, and which is ancestral to modern East Asians. The deep Tianyuan and East Asian lineages form a sister branch to Andamanese and Australasian populations, with all of them being branches of Ancient East Eurasians. The main migration coming out of Siberia into the Americas would have happened 23,000 years ago.

A 2018 study analysed ancient Indigenous samples. The genetic evidence suggests that all Indigenous Americans ultimately descended from a founding population that diverged from East Asians and subsequently admixed with Ancient North Eurasians. The authors also provided evidence that the basal northern and southern Indigenous American branches, to which all other Indigenous peoples belong, diverged around 16,000 years ago.

A study published in the Nature journal in 2018 concluded that Indigenous Americans descended from a single founding population which initially divided from East Asians about ~36,000 (±1,500) years BP, with gene flow between this divided group of Ancestral Indigenous Americans and Siberians persisting until about ~25,000 (±1,100) years BP, before merging with Ancient North Eurasians and subsequently becoming isolated in the Americas or Beringia at ~22,000 years BP. Northern and Southern American Indigenous sub-populations split from each other at roughly ~17,500 to 14,600 years BP. There is also some evidence for a back-migration from the Americas into Siberia after ~11,500 years BP.

A study published in the Cell journal in 2019, analysed 49 ancient Indigenous American samples from all over North and South America, and concluded that all Indigenous American populations descended from a single ancestral source population which divided from Ancient East Asians, and admixed with Ancient North Eurasians (ANE), and gave rise to the "Ancestral Indigenous Americans", which later diverged into the various Indigenous groups. The authors further dismissed previous claims for the possibility of two distinct population groups among the peopling of the Americas. Both Northern and Southern Indigenous Americans are closest to each other and do not show evidence of admixture with hypothetical previous populations.

A review article published in the Nature journal in 2021, which summarized the results of previous genomic studies, similarly concluded that all Indigenous Americans descended from the movement of people from Northeast Asia into the Americas. These Ancestral Americans, once south of the continental ice sheets, spread and expanded rapidly, and branched into multiple groups, which later gave rise to the major subgroups of Indigenous American populations. The study also dismissed the existence, inferred from craniometric data, of a hypothetical distinct non-Indigenous American population (suggested to have been related to Indigenous Australians and Papuans), sometimes called "Paleoamerican". However, the possibility of other sources contributing to the genetic makeup of Indigenous Americans is not dismissed and are speculated to exist as 'genetic ghosts'.

Genetic studies also show Amerindian-like backflow into present Siberian groups, especially those from the Kamchatka Peninsula.

Overall, 'Ancestral Native Americans' descend from the admixture of an Ancient East Asian lineage and a Paleolithic Siberian population known as Ancient North Eurasians. Ancestral Native Americans are most closely related to 'Ancient Paleo-Siberians' and 'Ancient Beringians'. According to a study from 2016, ANE ancestry in Native Americans ranges from 25% to 53%. Native Americans (Amerindians) have also been described as being of "primarily East Asian ancestry, with a smaller contribution from palaeolithic West Eurasian populations", via their ANE ancestry. Another study estimates ANE ancestry in Native Americans to be about 14-38%, although some Andean groups have higher amounts at 41%. A 2023 study describes the East Asian ancestry as arising from northern coastal China, which also contributed to other groups such as East Asians, Jōmon people and East Siberians. Australasian-related admixture has also been detected in several Native American populations.

== Y-chromosome DNA ==
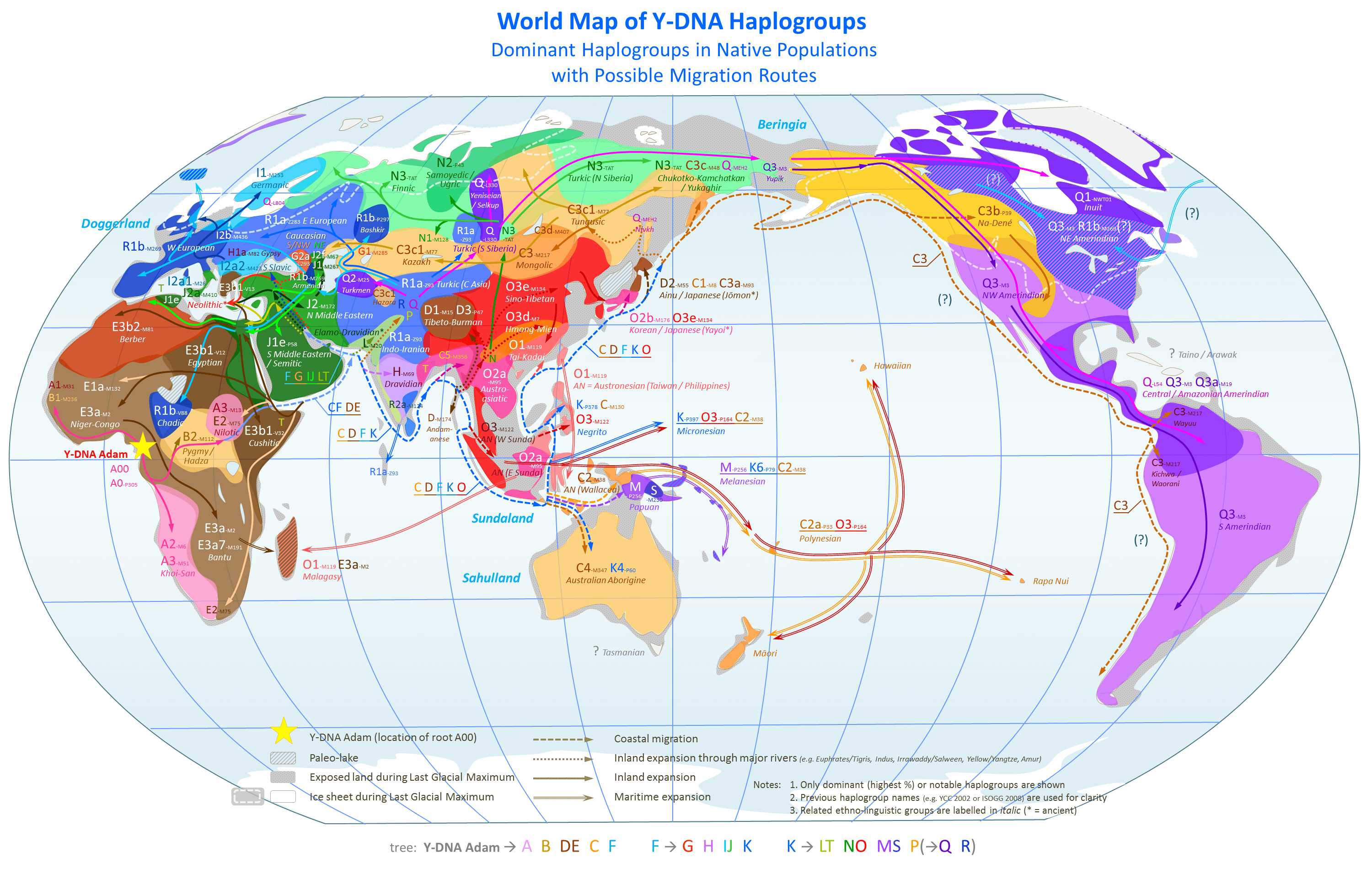
Map of Y-Chromosome Haplogroups - Dominant haplogroups in pre-colonial populations with proposed migration routes.

Haplogroups Q-L472 (Q1) and C-L1373 (C2a) were the only Y-DNA haplogroups present in the pre-Columbian Americas; the presence of other haplogroups (such as R1b1a1a2) in contemporary Indigenous American populations is attributed to post-contact admixture. A "Central Siberian" origin for these paternal lineages has been postulated.

The micro-satellite diversity and distribution of a Y lineage specific to South America suggest that certain Indigenous American populations became isolated after the initial colonization of their regions. The Na-Dene, Inuit, and Native Alaskan populations exhibit haplogroup Q (Y-DNA) mutations, but are distinct from other Indigenous Americans with various mtDNA and autosomal DNA (atDNA) mutations. This suggests that the earliest migrants into the northern extremes of North America and Greenland derived from later migrant populations.

=== Haplogroup Q-L472 (Q1) ===
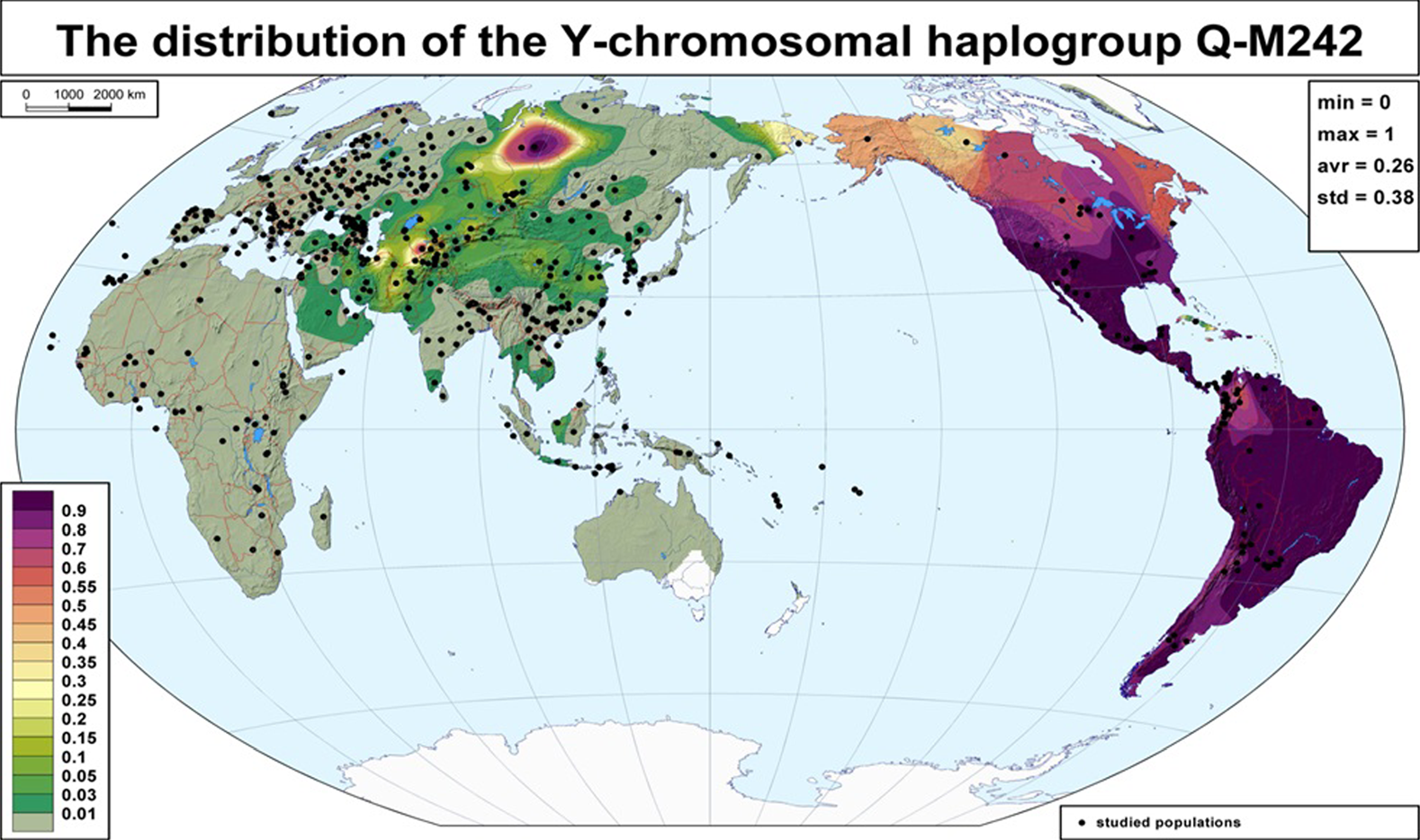
Frequency distribution of Y-DNA haplogroup Q.

All instances of Y-DNA haplogroup Q in the pre-Columbian Americas fall under Q-L472 (Q1). In Eurasia, haplogroup Q is found among the ancient Afontova Gora specimens, and Indigenous Siberian populations, such as the modern Chukchi and Koryak peoples, as well as some Southeast Asians, such as the Dayak people. In particular, two groups exhibit large concentrations of haplogroup Q, the Ket (93.8%) and the Selkup (66.4%) peoples. The Ket are thought to be the only survivors of ancient wanderers living in Siberia. Their population size is very small; there are fewer than 1,500 Ket in Russia.^{2002} The Selkup have a slightly larger population size than the Ket, with approximately 4,250 individuals.

Starting the Paleo-Indigenous American period, a migration to the Americas across the Bering Strait (Beringia) by a small population carrying haplogroup Q-L54 occurred. A member of this initial population underwent a mutation, which defines its descendant population, known by the Q-M3 (SNP) mutation, these descendants migrated all over the Americas.

Haplogroup Q-M3 is defined by the presence of the rs3894 (M3) (SNP). The Q-M3 mutation is roughly 15,000 years old as that is when the initial migration of Paleo-Indigenous Americans into the Americas occurred. Q-M3 is the predominant haplotype in the Americas, at a rate of 83% in South American populations, 50% in the Na-Dene populations, and in North American Eskimo-Aleut populations at about 46%. With minimal back-migration of Q-M3 in Eurasia, the mutation likely evolved in east-Beringia, or more specifically the Seward Peninsula or western Alaskan interior. The Beringia land mass began submerging, cutting off land routes.

Since the discovery of Q-M3, several subclades of M3-bearing populations have been discovered. An example is in South America, where some populations have a high prevalence of (SNP) M19, which defines subclade Q-M19. M19 has been detected in (59%) of Amazonian Ticuna men and in (10%) of Wayuu men. Subclade M19 appears to be unique to South American Indigenous peoples, arising 5,000 to 10,000 years ago. This suggests that population isolation, and perhaps even the establishment of tribal groups, began soon after migration into the South American areas. Other American subclades include Q-L54, Q-Z780, Q-SA01, and Q-M346 lineages. In Canada, two other lineages have been found. These are Q-P89.1 and Q-NWT01.

=== Haplogroup C-L1373 (C2a) ===
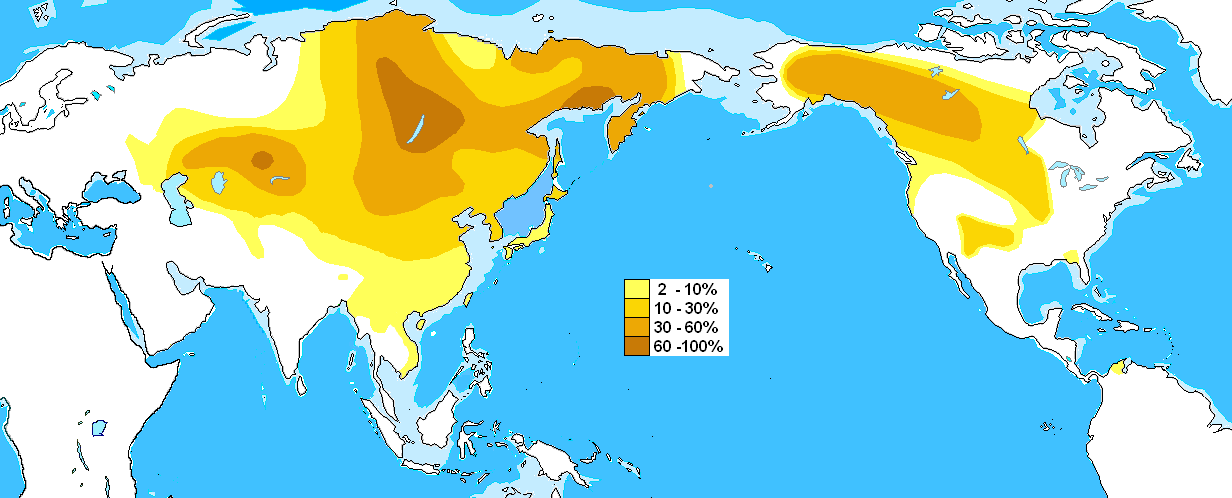
Distribution of Y-DNA haplogroup C2 (C-M217), formerly known as C3.

All instances of Y-DNA haplogroup C in the pre-Columbian Americas fall under C-L1373 (C2a), specifically its subclades C-P39, C-MPB373, and C-L1373*. C-P39 is most common in the Na-Dene peoples, from whom it is thought to originate, with the highest frequency found in the Athabaskan peoples at 42%; C-P39 is also found at lower frequencies in populations adjacent to Na-Dene peoples. C-MPB373 is found in the Waorani and Amazonian Kichwa of the northwestern Amazon lowlands and in the Salasaka Kichwa and Otavalo Kichwa of the Ecuadorian highlands. C-L1373* has only been found in a 9.85 ky-old Brazilian specimen from the archaeological site Lapa do Santo.

C-P39 is generally accepted to have originated from the Na-Dene migration into the Americas from the Russian Far East that occurred after the initial peopling of the Americas, but prior to modern Inuit, Inupiat, and Yupik expansions.

=== Haplogroup R-M269 (R1b1a1a2) ===
R1b1a1a2 (M269) is the second most common Y-DNA haplogroup found among Indigenous Americans after Y-DNA haplogroup Q.

The R1b1a1a2 (M269) lineages commonly found in Native Americans are in most cases belonged to R1b1a1a2 (M269) subclade most common in western Europeans, and its highest concentration is found among a variety of the Algonquin speaking tribes in eastern North America.

Thus, according to several authors, R1b was most likely introduced through admixture during the post-1492 European settlement of North America.

R1b1a1a2 (M269) is found predominantly in North American groups like the Ojibwe (50-79%), Seminole (50%), Sioux (50%), Cherokee (47%), Dogrib (40%) and Tohono O'odham (Papago) (38%). Its highest frequency is found in northeastern North America, and declines in frequency from east to west. In southwestern Native American tribes the frequency of this haplogroup is as low as 4%.

=== Data ===
Listed here are notable Indigenous peoples of the Americas by human Y-chromosome DNA haplogroups based on relevant studies. The samples are taken from individuals identified with the ethnic and linguistic designations in the first two columns, the fourth column (n) is the sample size studied, and the other columns give the percentage of the particular haplogroup.

Group	Language	Place	n	C	Q	R1	Others	Reference
Algonquian (Note: Algonquian ethnic groups: Ojibwe, Cheyenne/Arapaho, Shawnee, Mi'kmaq, Kickapoo and Meskwaki.)	Algic	Northeast North America	155	7.7	33.5 (Note: Q-M3=12.9; Q(xM3)=20.6.)	38.1	20.6	Bolnick 2006
Apache	Na-Dene	SW United States	96	14.6	78.1	5.2	2.1	Zegura 2004
Athabaskan (Note: Athabaskan ethnic groups: Chipewyan, Tłı̨chǫ, Tanana, Apache and Navajo.)	Na-Dene	Western North America	243	11.5	70.4	18.1		Malhi 2008
Cherokee	Iroquoian	SE United States	62	1.6	50.0 (Note: Q-M3=32.; Q3(xM3)=17.7.)	37.1	11.3	Bolnick 2006
Cherokee	Iroquoian	Eastern North America	30		50.0	46.7	3.3	Malhi 2008
Cheyenne	Algic	United States	44	16	61	16	7	Zegura 2004
Chibchan (Note: Chibchan ethnic groups: Ngöbe and Guna peoples.)	Macro-Chibchan	Panama	26		100			Zegura 2004
Chipewyan	Na-Dene	Canada	48	6	31 (Note: Q-M3=6; Q(xM3)=25.)		62.5 (Note: P1(xQ) 62.5%. While other studies identify this as R(xR2)/R1b, the subject remains controversial (see Hammer, Michael F. et al 2005))	Bortoloni 2003
Chippewa	Algic	Eastern North America	97	4.1	15.9	50.5	29.9	Bolnick 2006
Dogrib	Na-Dene	Canada	15	33	27	40		Malhi 2008
Dogrib	Na-Dene	Canada	37	35.1	45.9 (Note: Q-M3=40.5; Q(xM3)=5.4.)	8.1	10.8	Dulik 2012
Gê (Note: Gê ethnic groups: Gorotire, Kaigang, Kraho, Mekranoti and Xikrin.)	Macro-Jê	Brazil	51		92 (Note: Q-M3=90; Q(xM3)=2))	8		Bortoloni 2003
Guaraní	Tupian	Paraguay	59		86 (Note: Q-M3=79; Q(xM3)=7.)	9	5	Bortoloni 2003
Inga	Quechua	Colombia	11		78 (Note: Q-M3=11; Q(xM3)=67.)	11	11	Bortoloni 2003
Inuit	Eskimo–Aleut	North American Arctic	60		80.0	11.7	8.3	Zegura 2004
Inuvialuit	Eskimo–Aleut	Canada	56	1.8	55.1 (Note: Q-M3=10.7; NWT01=44.6.)	33.9	8.9	Dulik 2012
Maya	Mayan	Mesoamerica	71		87.3	12.7		Zegura 2004
Mixe	Mixe–Zoque	Mexico	12		100			Zegura 2004
Mixtec	Oto-Manguean	Mexico	28		93	7		Zegura 2004
Muskogean (Note: Muskogean ethnic groups: Chickasaw, Choctaw, Muscogee and Seminole.)	Muskogean	SE United States	36	2.8	75 (Note: Q-M3=50.0; Q(xM3)=25.0.)	11.1	11.1	Bolnick 2006
Nahua	Uto-Aztecan	Mexico	17		94		6	Malhi 2008
Native Americans (United States)		United States	398	9.0	58.1	22.2	10.7	Hammer 2005
Navajo	Na-Dene	SW United States	78	1.3	92.3	2.6	3.8	Zegura 2004
Indigenous North Americans		North America	530	6.0	77.2	12.5	4.3	Zegura 2004
Papago	Uto-Aztecan	SW United States	13		61.5	38.5		Malhi 2008
Seminole	Muskogean	Eastern North America	20		45.0	50.0	5.0	Malhi 2008
Sioux	Macro-Siouan	Central North America	44	11	25	50	14	Zegura 2004
South America	Amerindian	South America	390		92 (Note: Q-M3=83; Q(xM3)=9.)	4	4	Bortoloni 2003
Tanana	Na-Dene	Northwest North America	12	42	42	8	8	Zegura 2004
Ticuna	Ticuna–Yuri	West Amazon basin	33		100 (Note: Q-M3=89; Q(xM3)=11.)			Bortoloni 2003
Tlingit	Na-Dene	Pacific Northwest	11	18 (Note: C3*=9; C3b=9)	82 (Note: Q-M3=64; Q-MEH2*=9; Q-NWT01=9.)			Dulik 2012
Tupí–Guaraní (Note: Tupi–Guarani Brazilian ethnic groups: Asuriní, Parakanã, Ka'apor and Wayampi.)	Tupian	Brazil	54		100 (Note: All examples of haplogroup Q were Q-M3.)			Bortoloni 2003
Uto-Aztecan (Note: Uto-Aztecan ethnic groups: Pima, Tohono O'odham, Tarahumara, Nahua, Cora and Huichol.)	Uto-Aztecan	Mexico, Arizona	167		93.4	6.0		Malhi 2008
Warao	Warao (isolate)	Caribbean South America	12		100			Bortoloni 2003
Wayúu	Arawakan	Guajira Peninsula	19		69 (Note: Q-M3=48; Q(xM3)=21.)	21	10	Bortoloni 2003
Wayúu	Arawakan	Guajira Peninsula	25	8	36	44	12	Zegura 2004
Yagua	Peba–Yaguan	Peru	7		100 (Note: Q-M3=86<; Q(xM3)=14.)			Bortoloni 2003
Yukpa	Cariban	Colombia	12		100			Bortoloni 2003
Zapotec	Oto-Manguean	Mexico	16		75	6	19	Zegura 2004
Zenú	extinct	Colombia	30		81 (Note: Q-M3=33; Q(xM3)=48.)		19	Bortoloni 2003

== Mitochondrial DNA ==
The common occurrence of the mtDNA Haplogroups A, B, C, and D among eastern Asian and Indigenous American populations has long been recognized, along with the presence of Haplogroup X. As a whole, the greatest frequency of the four Indigenous American associated haplogroups occurs in the Altai-Baikal region of southern Siberia. Some subclades of C and D closer to the Indigenous American subclades occur among Mongolian, Amur, Japanese, Korean, and Ainu populations. A 2023 DNA study found that "[i]n addition to previously described ancestral sources in Siberia, Australo-Melanesia, and Southeast Asia, ... northern coastal China also contributed to the gene pool of Native Americans" as well as that of Japanese people.

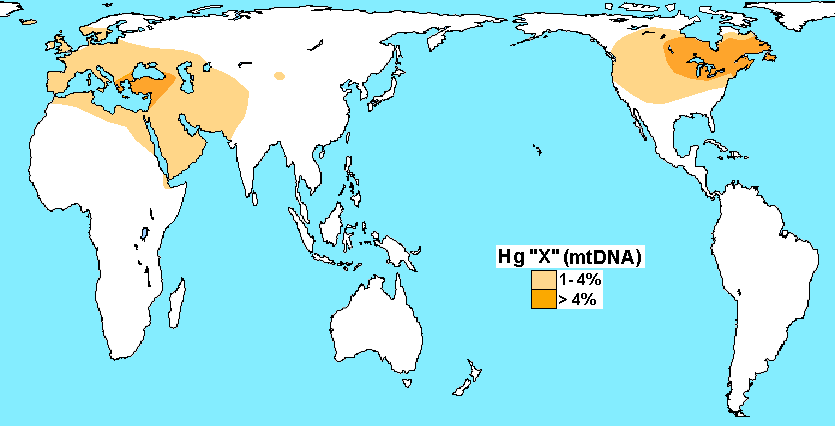
Distribution of haplogroup X

When studying human mitochondrial DNA haplogroup, the results indicated that Indigenous American haplogroups, including haplogroup X, are part of a single founding East Asian population. It also indicates that the distribution of mtDNA haplogroups and the levels of sequence divergence among linguistically similar groups were the result of multiple preceding migrations from Bering Straits populations. All Indigenous American mtDNA can be traced back to five haplogroups: A, B, C, D and X. More specifically, Indigenous American mtDNA belongs to sub-haplogroups A2, B2, C1b, C1c, C1d, D1, and X2a (with minor groups C4c, D2a, and D4h3a). This suggests that 95% of Indigenous American mtDNA is descended from a minimal genetic founding female population, comprising sub-haplogroups A2, B2, C1b, C1c, C1d, and D1. The remaining 5% is composed of the X2a, X6, D2a, C4c, and D4h3a sub-haplogroups.

Native Americans belonging to haplogroup X mostly belong to the X2a clade, which has never been found in the Old World. According to Jennifer Raff, X2a probably originated in the same Siberian population as the other four founding maternal lineages.

Haplogroup X genetic sequences diverged about 20,000 to 30,000 years ago to give two sub-groups, X1 and X2. X2's subclade X2a occurs only at a frequency of about 3% for the total current Indigenous population of the Americas. However, X2a is a major mtDNA subclade in North America; among the Algonquian peoples, it comprises up to 25% of mtDNA types. It is also present in lower percentages to the west and south of this area — among the Sioux (15%), the Nuu-chah-nulth (11%–13%), the Navajo (7%), and the Yakama (5%). The predominant theory for sub-haplogroup X2a's appearance in North America is migration along with A, B, C, and D mtDNA groups, from a source in the Altai Mountains of central Asia. Haplotype X6 was present in the Tarahumara 1.8% (1/53) and Huichol 20% (3/15)

Sequencing of the mitochondrial genome from Paleo-Eskimo remains (3,500 years old) are distinct from modern Indigenous Americans, falling within sub-haplogroup D2a1, a group observed among today's Aleutian Islanders, the Aleut and Siberian Yupik populations. This suggests that the colonizers of the far north, and subsequently Greenland, originated from later coastal populations. Then began a genetic exchange in the northern extremes introduced by the Thule people (proto-Inuit) approximately 800–1,000 years ago. These final Pre-Columbian migrants introduced haplogroups A2a and A2b to the existing Paleo-Eskimo populations of Canada and Greenland, culminating in the modern Inuit.

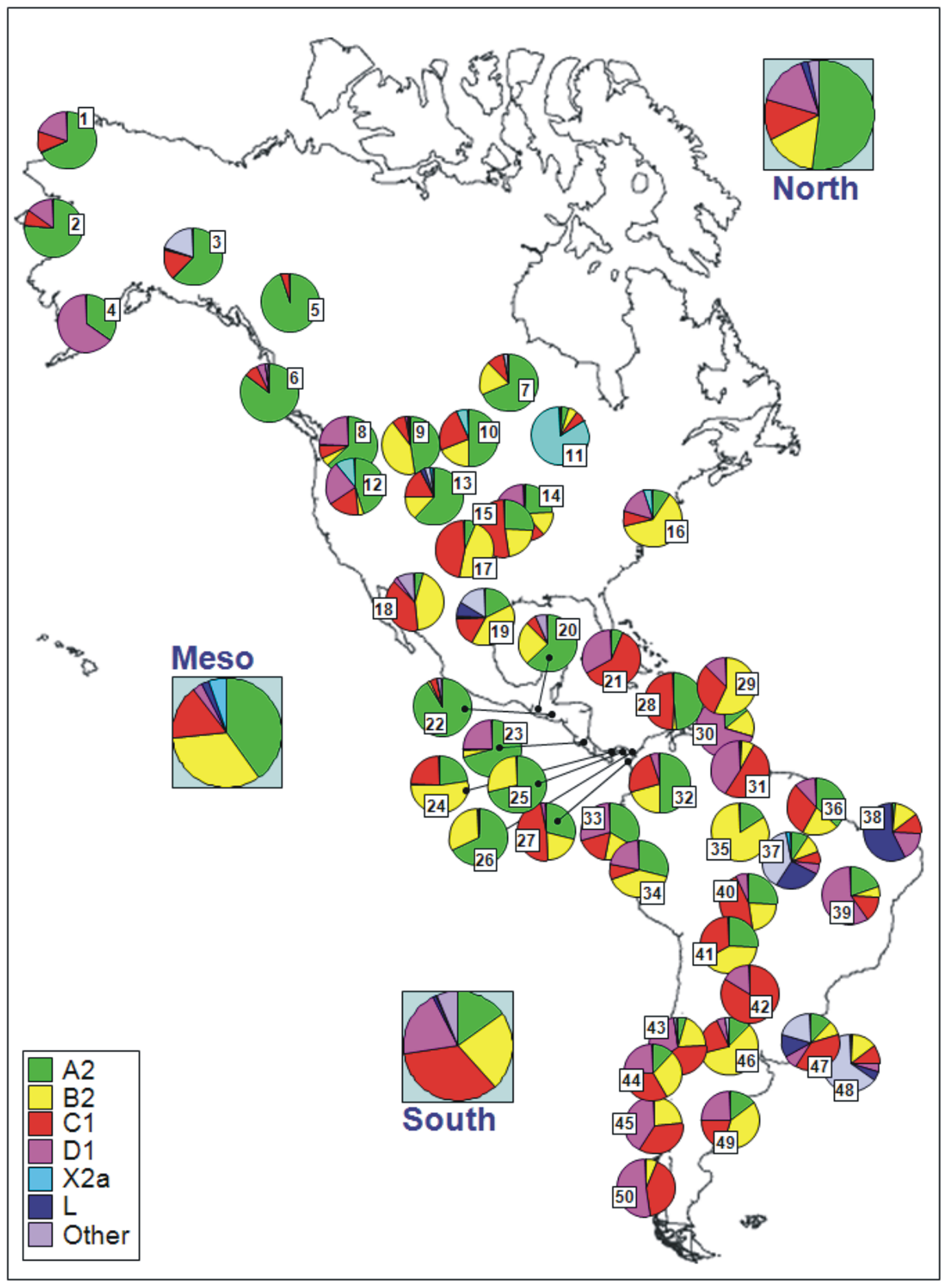
Frequency distribution of the main mtDNA American haplogroups in Indigenous American populations.

A route through Beringia is seen as more likely than the Solutrean hypothesis. An abstract in a 2012 issue of the "American Journal of Physical Anthropology" states that "The similarities in ages and geographical distributions for C4c and the previously analyzed X2a lineage provide support to the scenario of a dual origin for Paleo-Indigenous Americans. Taking into account that C4c is deeply rooted in the Asian portion of the mtDNA phylogeny and is indubitably of Asian origin, the finding that C4c and X2a are characterized by parallel genetic histories definitively dismisses the controversial hypothesis of an Atlantic glacial entry route into North America."

Another study, also focused on the mtDNA (which is inherited through only the maternal line), revealed that the Indigenous people of the Americas can trace their maternal ancestry back to a few founding lineages from East Asia, which would have arrived by way of the Bering Strait. According to this study, it is probable that the ancestors of the Indigenous Americans would have remained for a time in the region of the Bering Strait, after which there would have been a rapid movement of settling of the Americas, taking the founding lineages to South America.

According to a 2016 study, focused on mtDNA lineages, "a small population entered the Americas via a coastal route around 16.0 ka, following previous isolation in eastern Beringia for ~2.4 to 9 thousand years after separation from eastern Siberian populations. Following a rapid movement throughout the Americas, limited gene flow in South America resulted in a marked phylogeographic structure of populations, which persisted through time. All of the ancient mitochondrial lineages detected in this study were absent from modern data sets, suggesting a high extinction rate. To investigate this further, we applied a novel principal components multiple logistic regression test to Bayesian serial coalescent simulations. The analysis supported a scenario in which European colonization caused a substantial loss of pre-Columbian lineages".

== Genetic admixture ==
=== Ancient Beringians ===
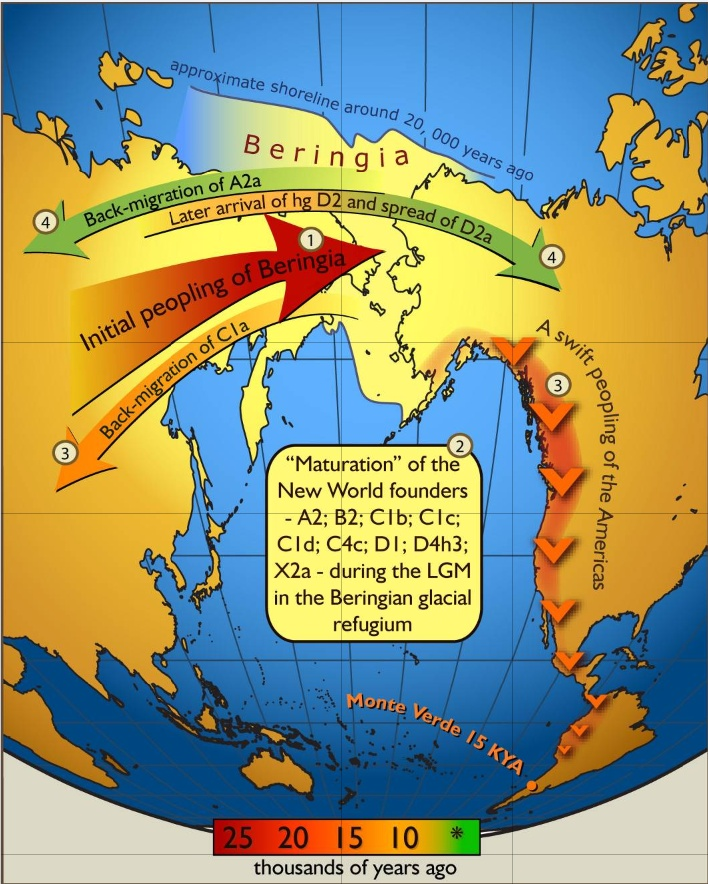
Figure 2. Schematic illustration of maternal (mtDNA) gene-flow in and out of Beringia (long chronology, single source model).

Recent archaeological findings in Alaska have shed light on the existence of a previously unknown Indigenous American population that has been academically named "Ancient Beringians". Although it is popularly agreed among archeologists that early settlers had crossed into Alaska from Russia through the Bering Strait land bridge, the issue of whether or not there was one founding group or several waves of migration is a controversial and prevalent debate among academics in the field today. In 2018, the sequenced DNA of an Indigenous girl, whose remains were found at the Upward Sun River archaeological site in Alaska in 2013, proved not to match the two recognized branches of Indigenous Americans and instead belonged to the early population of Ancient Beringians. This breakthrough is said to be the first direct genomic evidence that there was potentially only one wave of migration in the Americas that occurred, with genetic branching and division transpiring after the fact. The migration wave is estimated to have emerged about 20,000 years ago. The Ancient Beringians are said to be a common ancestral group among contemporary Indigenous American populations today, which differs in results collected from previous research that suggests that modern populations are descendants of either Northern and Southern branches. Experts were also able to use wider genetic evidence to establish that the split between the Northern and Southern American branches from the Ancient Beringians in Alaska only occurred about 17,000 and 14,000 years, further challenging the concept of multiple migration waves occurring during the very first stages of settlement.

Genetic evidence for Paleo-Indigenous Americans consists of the presence of apparent admixture of archaic Sundadont lineages to the remote populations in the South American rain forest, and in the genetics of Patagonians-Fuegians.

Nomatto et al. (2009) proposed migration into Beringia occurred between 40,000 and 30,000 BP, with a pre-LGM (Last Glacial Maximum) migration into the Americas followed by isolation of the northern population following closure of the ice-free corridor.

A 2016 genetic study of Indigenous peoples of the Amazonian region of Brazil (by Skoglund and Reich) showed evidence of admixture from a separate lineage of an otherwise unknown ancient people. This ancient group appears to be related to modern day "Australasian" peoples (i.e. Aboriginal Australians and Melanesians). This "Ghost population" was found in speakers of Tupian languages. They provisionally named this ancient group; "Population Y", after Ypykuéra, "which means 'ancestor' in the Tupi language family".

Archaeological evidence for pre-LGM human presence in the Americas was first presented in the 1970s. notably the "Luzia Woman" skull found in Brazil.

=== Old world ===
The current distribution of Indigenous peoples (based on self-identification, not genetic data).

Substantial racial admixture has taken place during and since the European colonization of the Americas.

==== South and Central America ====
In Latin America in particular, significant racial admixture took place between the Indigenous American population, the European-descended colonial population, and the Sub-Saharan African populations imported as slaves. From about 1700, a Latin American terminology developed to refer to the various combinations of mixed racial descent produced by this.

Many individuals who self-identify as one race exhibit genetic evidence of a multiracial ancestry. Mixed-race children were generally identified by the Spanish colonist and Portuguese colonist as "Castas".

==== North America ====
The North American fur trade during the 16th century brought many European men, from France, Ireland, and Great Britain, who married Indigenous North American women. In the areas where these peoples formed communities, and developed a unique, syncretic culture, their children became known as "Métis" or "Bois-Brûlés" by the French colonists. In some contexts these peoples have also been referred to as "mixed-bloods", or "country-born" by the English and Scottish colonists.

Native Americans in the United States are defined by citizenship, culture, and familial relationships, not race. Having never defined Native American identity as racial, historically, Native Americans have commonly practiced what mainstream society defines as interracial marriage, which has affected racial ideas of blood quantum.

In the United States 2010 census, nearly 3 million people indicated that their race was Indigenous American (including Alaskan Native). This is based on self-identification, as the census does not require documentation of this belief. Especially numerous was the self-identification of Cherokee ethnic origin, a phenomenon dubbed the "Cherokee Syndrome", where some Americans believe they have a "long-lost Cherokee ancestor" without being able to identify any Cherokee or Native American people in their family tree or among their living relatives. This cultivation of an opportunistic ethnic identity is related to the "prestige" non-Natives may associate with Indigenous American ancestry. In the Eastern United States, in particular, pretendians are common.

Some tribes have adopted blood quantum requirements, or Certificates of Degree of Indian Blood, and practice disenrollment of tribal members unable to prove they are the child of an enrolled tribal member. In these cases, the tribe may demand a paternity test. For some, this has become a contentious issue in Native American reservation politics.

=== European diseases and genetic modification ===
A team led by Ripan Malhi, an anthropologist at the University of Illinois in Urbana, conducted a study where they used a scientific technique known as whole exome sequencing to test immune-related gene variants within Indigenous Americans. Through analyzing ancient and modern Indigenous DNA, it was found that HLA-DQA1, a variant gene that codes for protein in charge of differentiating between healthy cells from invading viruses and bacteria were present in nearly 100% of ancient remains but only 36% in modern Indigenous Americans. These finding suggest that European-borne epidemics such as smallpox altered the disease landscape of the Americas, leaving survivors of these outbreaks less likely to carry variants like HLA-DQA1. This made them less able to cope with new diseases. The change in genetic makeup is measured by scientists to have occurred around 175 years ago, during a time when the smallpox epidemic was raging through the Americas.

== Blood groups ==
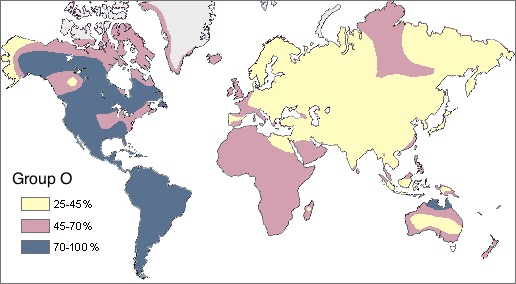
Frequency of O group in Indigenous populations. Note the predominance of this group in Indigenous Americans.

Prior to the 1952 confirmation of DNA as the hereditary material by Alfred Hershey and Martha Chase, scientists used blood proteins to study human genetic variation. The ABO blood group system is widely credited to have been discovered by the Austrian Karl Landsteiner, who found three different blood types in 1900. Blood groups are inherited from both parents. The ABO blood type is controlled by a single gene (the ABO gene) with three alleles: i, I^{A}, and I^{B}.

Research by Ludwik and Hanka Herschfeld during World War I found that the frequencies of blood groups A, B and O differed greatly from region to region. The "O" blood type (usually resulting from the absence of both A and B alleles) is very common around the world, with a rate of 63% in all human populations. Type "O" is the primary blood type among the Indigenous populations of the Americas, particularly within Central and South American populations, with a frequency of nearly 100%. In Indigenous North American populations the frequency of type "A" ranges from 16% to 82%. This suggests again that the initial Indigenous Americans evolved from an isolated population with a minimal number of individuals.

The standard explanation for such a high population of Indigenous Americans with blood type O is genetic drift. Because the ancestral population of Indigenous Americans was numerically small, blood type diversity could have been reduced from generation to generation by the founder effect. Other related explanations include the Bottleneck explanation which states that there were high frequencies of blood type A and B among Indigenous Americans but severe population decline during the 1500s and 1600s caused by the introduction of disease from Europe resulted in the massive death toll of those with blood types A and B. Coincidentally, a large amount of the survivors were type O.

Distribution of ABO blood types in various modern Indigenous American populations Test results as of 2008
PEOPLE GROUP	O (%)	A (%)	B (%)	AB (%)
Blackfoot Confederacy (Indigenous North American)	17	82	0	1
Bororo (Brazil)	100	0	0	0
Eskimos (Alaska)	38	44	13	5
Inuit (Eastern Canada & Greenland)	54	36	23	8
Hawaiians (Polynesians, non-Indigenous American)	37	61	2	1
Indigenous North Americans (as a whole Native Nations/First Nations)	79	16	4	1
Maya (modern)	98	1	1	1
Navajo	73	27	0	0
Peru	100	0	0	0

The Di^{a} antigen of the Diego antigen system has been found only in Indigenous peoples of the Americas and East Asians, and in people with some ancestry from those groups. The frequency of the Di^{a} antigen in various groups of Indigenous peoples of the Americas ranges from almost 50% to 0%. Differences in the frequency of the antigen in populations of Indigenous people in the Americas correlate with major language families, modified by environmental conditions.

== See also ==
- Introduction to genetics
- Archaeogenetics
- Archaeology of the Americas
- Ancient DNA
- Clovis culture
- Early human migrations
- Genetic history of Africa
- Genetic history of Europe
- Genetic history of Italy
- Genetic history of North Africa
- Genetic history of the British Isles
- Genetic history of the Iberian Peninsula
- Genetic history of the Middle East
- Genetics and archaeogenetics of South Asia
- List of haplogroups of historic people
- Mayan genetics
- Race and genetics
- Settlement of the Americas § Genomic age estimates
- List of Y-chromosome haplogroups in populations of the world
