= Native North American =

Native North American may refer to:

- Indigenous peoples in Canada
- Native Americans in the United States
  - Alaska Natives
- Indigenous peoples of Mexico
- Northern Native American (genetic lineage)
