= Haplogroup Q-M323 =

Human Y-chromosome DNA haplogroup

- Possible place of origin: Eurasia
- Ancestor: Q-M346
- Defining mutations: M323

Haplogroup Q-M323 is a subclade of Y-DNA Haplogroup Q-M346. Haplogroup Q-M323 is defined by the presence of the M323 Single Nucleotide Polymorphism (SNP).

== Distribution ==
Q-M323 was discovered in the Yemeni Jewish population,where it is found in 5% of Modern Jewish Yeminis. In the time since its discovery, it has not been detected in other populations. It could then be exclusive to this population.

== Associated SNPs ==
Q-M323 is currently defined by the M323 SNP.

== Subgroups ==
This is Thomas Krahn at the Genomic Research Center's Draft tree Proposed Tree for haplogroup Q-M323.

- Q-M346 M346, L56, L57, L474, L892, L942
  - Q-M323 M323

== See also ==
- Human Y-chromosome DNA haplogroup

=== Y-DNA Q-M242 Subclades ===
- Q-M242
- Q-L275
- Q-L330
- Q-L717
- Q-L940
- Q-L53
- Q-L54
- Q-M120
- Q-B143
- Q-M25
- Q-M3
- Q-M323
- Q-M346
- Q-NWT01
- Q-P89.1
- Q-Z780
