= Haplogroup Q-L53 =

Human Y-chromosome DNA haplogroup

- Possible place of origin: Eurasia or North America
- Ancestor: Q-M346
- Descendants: Q-L54, Q-YP4010
- Defining mutations: L53, L55, L213, L331, L475, L476

Q-L53 is a subclade of haplogroup Q-M346. Q-L53 is defined by the presence of the L53 Single Nucleotide Polymorphism (SNP).

== Distribution ==
Q-L53 has descendants across much of Eurasia and in the pre-Columbian Americas. It is the parent of the major Haplogroup Q-L54 branch.

== Associated SNPs ==
Q-L53 is currently defined by the L53 SNP as well as the L55, L213, L331, L475, and L476 SNPs.

== Subgroups ==
This is Thomas Krahn at the Genomic Research Center's Draft tree Proposed Tree for haplogroup Q-L53. It shows the first two branch points.

- Q-L53 L53, L55, L213, L331, L475, L476
  - Q-L54 L54
    - Q-M3 M3, L341.2
    - Q-Z780 Z780
    - Q-L456 L456
    - Q-L568 L568, L569, L570, L571
    - Q-L330 L330, L334
    - Q-L804 L804, L805

== See also ==
- Human Y-chromosome DNA haplogroup

=== Y-DNA Q-M242 subclades ===
- Q-M242
- Q-L275
- Q-L330
- Q-L717
- Q-L940
- Q-L53
- Q-L54
- Q-M120
- Q-B143
- Q-M25
- Q-M3
- Q-M323
- Q-M346
- Q-NWT01
- Q-P89.1
- Q-Z780
