= Haplogroup Q-L275 =

Human Y-chromosome DNA haplogroup

Haplogroup Q-L275 or Q2
- Frequency distribution of haplogroup Q-L275.
- Possible place of origin: Eurasia
- Ancestor: Q-M242
- Descendants: Q-M378
- Defining mutations: L275, L314, L606, L612

Haplogroup Q-L275 or haplogroup Q2 (formerly Q1b) is a human Y-chromosome DNA haplogroup believed to have originated in Eurasia. Haplogroup Q-L275 is defined by the presence of the L275 single-nucleotide polymorphism (SNP). Haplogroup Q-L275 can be identified through genealogical DNA testing.

== Origins ==
Detailed and modern phylogenetic analysis of haplogroup Q-L275 supports the hypothesis of a West Asian or Central Asian homeland better than any other. Therefore, Q-L275 is defined as one of the West Eurasian Paleolithic haplogroups.

== Distribution ==
Q-L275 has descendants across Europe, Central Asia, and South Asia. Q-M378 is phylogeographically restricted to southwest Asia.

=== The Americas ===
Q-L275 has not been identified in pre-Columbian groups in the Americas, but is sporadically found among modern Native Americans. Potential sources in indigenous populations are European colonists and religious missionaries. According to Batfaglia, et al, Q-M378 in Native American populations can be attributed to historical migrants from Southwest Asia in the modern historical period. The Isleños of Louisiana trace their origins to settlers from the Canary Islands and Iberian regions including Andalusia, Asturias, Castile, Galicia, and Portugal. Recruited by Governor Bernardo de Gálvez, they migrated to Spanish Louisiana between 1778 and 1783, establishing communities in St. Bernard Parish, Ascension Parish, Assumption Parish, and Plaquemines Parish to bolster colonial defense and development. Genetic studies of descendants reveal significant Iberian and Canary ancestry, with Y-DNA subclade Q-L245 (linked to Levantine (Hebrew) origins via Sephardic conversos) entering the Americas through these settlers in the late 1700s.

=== Asia ===
==== South Asia ====
The problematic phylogeny sampling of early studies has been demonstrated by subsequent studies that have found the Q-M378 descendant branch in South Asia.

==== West Asia ====
According to Behar et al. 5% of Ashkenazi males belong to haplogroup Q. This has subsequently been found to be entirely Q-L275's Q-M378 subclade and is further restricted to the Q-L245 branch.

=== Subclade Distribution ===
Q-L245 This branch was discovered by citizen scientists. It is a descendant branch of the Q-M378 lineage and is the most common branch in West Asian groups such as Iranians and Jewish populations. Q-L245 is shared across Ashkenazi, Sephardic, and Mizrahi Jewish populations that separated centuries to over a millennium ago, geneticists conclude it was present in the ancestral Levantine gene pool prior to the Jewish Diaspora.

Q-L272.1 This branch was discovered by citizen scientists. It has only been identified in one Sicilian sample.

Q-L301 This branch was discovered by citizen scientists. They have identified it in two unrelated Iranian samples.

Q-L315 This branch was discovered by citizen scientists. It has only been identified in one Ashkenazi Jewish sample. Thus, it is presumed to have arisen after the Q-L245 branch to which it belongs became part of the pre-Diaspora Jewish population.

Q-L327 This branch was discovered by citizen scientists. It has only been identified in one Azorean sample.

Q-L619.2 This branch was discovered by citizen scientists. They have identified it in two unrelated Armenian samples.

Q-P306 This branch was discovered by the University of Arizona research group headed by Dr. Michael Hammer in a Southeast Asian sample. It has been identified by citizen scientists in South Asians.

Q-M378 — It is widely distributed in Europe, South Asia, and West Asia. It is found among samples of Hazaras and Sindhis. It has been found in one individual in a small sample of eleven Lachungpa in Sikkim. It is also found in the Uyghurs of North-Western China in two separate groups. Some Western Jews belong to Q-M378 as well. Q-M378's subbranch Q-L245's subclades Q-Y2200 and Q-YP1035 are the only varieties of haplogroup Q that are found in Ashkenazi Jews. Citizen scientists found that some Sephardic Jews carry different subclades of Q-L245, including Q-BZ3900, Q-YP745, and Q-YP1237.

== Associated SNPs ==
Q-L275 is currently defined by the SNPs L275, L314, L606, and L612.

== Subgroups ==
This is Thomas Krahn at the Genomic Research Center's Draft tree Proposed Tree for haplogroup Q-L275.

- L275, L314, L606, L612
  - M378, L214, L215
    - L245
      - L272.1
      - L315
      - L619.2
    - L301
    - P306
    - L327

== See also ==
- Human Y-chromosome DNA haplogroup
- Marsh Arabs (on the Y-DNA Q1b-M378 in Marsh Arabs related to Sumer)

=== Y-DNA Q-M242 Subclades ===
- Q-M242
- Q-L275
- Q-L330
- Q-L717
- Q-L940
- Q-L53
- Q-L54
- Q-M120
- Q-B143
- Q-M25
- Q-M3
- Q-M323
- Q-M346
- Q-NWT01
- Q-P89.1
- Q-Z780
