= Haplogroup Q-M120 =

Human Y-chromosome DNA haplogroup

- Possible time of origin: 15 400 ybp
- Possible place of origin: Asia or South Siberia
- Ancestor: Q1a1a (F746/NWT01)
- Defining mutations: M120 and M265 (AKA N14)

Haplogroup Q-M120, also known as Q1a1a1, is a Y-DNA haplogroup. It is the only primary branch of haplogroup Q1a1a (F746/NWT01). The lineage is most common amongst modern populations in eastern Eurasia.

But the haplogroup might have been historically widespread in the Eurasian steppe and north Asia since it is found among Cimmerians in Moldova and Bronze Age natives of Khövsgöl.

== Distribution ==
=== The Americas ===
One of the 1K Genomes samples, HG01944, from Peruvians in Lima, Peru belongs to Q-M120. Q-M120 is the other branch under Q-F746. It is best known as an East Asian branch of Q.

Grugni et al. (2019) found the presence of the Q-pre-M120 lineage, a precursor to Q-M120, among the Tsimshian people in Alaska.

=== Asia ===
Q-M120 is present in Eastern Asia and may trace its origin to East Asia. It has been found at low frequency in samples of Han Chinese, Dungans, Hmong Daw in Laos, Japanese, Dörwöd Kalmyks, Koreans, Mongols, Tibetans, Uygurs, and Vietnamese. It also has been found among Bhutanese, Murut people in Brunei, Tuvans, Nivkhs, Koryaks, Yukaghirs, and Azerbaijanis. Sengupta et al. (2006) reported finding Q-M120 in the HGDP sample of Pakistani Hazaras, but the Bayesian tree in Supplementary Figure 12 of Lippold et al. (2014) suggests that these HGDP Pakistani Hazara individuals more likely should belong to Q-L275, and that three members of the HGDP Naxi sample and one member of the HGDP Han sample should belong to Q-M120 instead. Di Cristofaro et al. (2013) tested the same sample of Pakistani Hazaras and reported that they belonged to the following Y-DNA haplogroups: 1/25 C-PK2/M386(xM407, M532), 9/25 C-M401, 1/25 I-M223, 1/25 J-M530, 2/25 O-M122(xM134), 1/25 Q-M242(xM120, M25, M346, M378), 1/25 Q-M378, 1/25 R-M124, 8/25 R-M478/M73.

Population	Paper	N	Percentage	SNP Tested
Nivkh (Sakhalin)	Kharkov 2024	3/37	~8.1%	M120
Dungan (Kyrgyzstan)	Wells 2001	3/40	~7.5%	M120
Han (Henan)	Su 2000	2/28	~7.1%	M120
Koryak	Kharkov 2024	1/20	~5.0%	M120
Han (Anhui)	Su 2000	1/22	~4.6%	M120
Northern Han	Su 2000	1/22	~4.5%	M120
Kinh (Ho Chi Minh City)	Poznik 2016	2/46	~4.3%	M120
Tuvan (Kungurtug)	Luis 2023	1/24	~4.17%	M120
Evenk (Yakutia)	Kharkov 2024	1/28	~3.5%	M120
Han (Shanghai)	Su 2000	1/30	~3.3%	M120
Han (Shandong)	Su 2000	1/32	~3.1%	M120
Korea	Wells 2001	1/45	~2.2%	M120
Tibetan (Lhasa)	Su 2000	1/46	~2.2%	M120
Tibet	Gayden 2007	2/156	~1.3%	M120
Han (Shanxi)	Zhong 2010	1/56	~1.8%	M120
Uygur (Xinjiang)	Zhong 2010	1/71	~1.4%	M120
Uygur (Xinjiang)	Zhong 2010	1/50	~2.0%	M120
Hmong Daw (Laos)	Cai 2011	1/51	~1.96%	M120
Han (Jiangsu)	Su 2000	1/55	~1.8%	M120
Mongolia	Di Cristofaro 2013	2/160	~1.25%	M120
Dörwöd Kalmyk	Malyarchuk 2013	4/426	~0.9%	M120
Japan	Nonaka 2007	1/263	~0.38%	M120

According to a 2019 study, Q-M120 can be found in high concentrations in the northern and eastern regions of China. To a lesser extent, it can be found in North Korea, South Korea and northern Philippines.

Population	N	Percentage with Q-M120	SNP Tested
J&K Kashmir Gujars (Jammu and Kashmir, India)	1/61	~1.6%	M120

Population	N	Percentage	SNP Tested
Baloch (Sistan and Baluchestan)	1/24	~4.2%	M120

Population	N	Percentage	SNP Tested
Georgian (Imereti)	1/26	~3.8%	M120

== Associated SNPs ==
Haplogroup Q-M120 is defined by the presence of the M120 Single Nucleotide Polymorphism (SNP) as well as the M265 (AKA N14) SNP.

== Phylogenetic tree ==
This is Thomas Krahn at the Genomic Research Center's Draft Tree for haplogroup Q-M120.

- Q-MEH2 MEH2, L472, L528
  - Q-M120 M120, N14/M265

== See also ==
- Human Y-chromosome DNA haplogroup

=== Y-DNA Q-M242 subclades ===
- Q-M242
- Q-L275
- Q-L330
- Q-L717
- Q-L940
- Q-L53
- Q-L54
- Q-M120
- Q-B143
- Q-M25
- Q-M3
- Q-M323
- Q-M346
- Q-NWT01
- Q-P89.1
- Q-Z780
