= Haplogroup Q-L54 =

Subclade of Y-DNA haplogroup Q-L53

- Possible place of origin: Eurasia or North America
- Ancestor: Q-L53
- Descendants: Q-L330, Q-M3, Q-Z780, Q-L804
- Defining mutations: L54

Haplogroup Q-L54 is a subclade of Y-DNA haplogroup Q-L53. Q1a3a-L54 is defined by the presence of the L54 Single Nucleotide Polymorphism (SNP).

== Distribution ==
Q-L54 has descendants across Western and Central Europe, the North and East of Asia, and the Americas. It includes two of the major pre-Columbian paternal lineages in the Americas: Q-M3 and Q-Z780. The boy Anzick-1, who lived 12,600 years ago and was found in the state of Montana, has a Y-chromosome that refers to haplogroup Q-M971 (Q-L54*(xM3)). Q-L54 descendant lines also include two Eurasian paternal lineages, the Central Asian Q-L330 lineage and the Scandinavian Q-L804. Q-L330 is also found in some men with Romaniote Jewish paternal lines from Greece, as well as Turks of Western Thrace. Q-L804 is Scandinavian and the TMRCA is just over 3000 years. Haplogroup Q‐L54 is dominant in two North Siberian populations, the Kets and Selkups, with frequencies of 97.7% and 66.7%, respectively. Baraba Tatars have ~ 50% haplogroup Q.

== Associated SNP's ==
Q-L54 is currently defined by the L54 SNP alone.

== Subgroups ==
Current status of the polygenetic tree for Q-L54 is published by Pinotti et al. in the article Y Chromosome Sequences Reveal a Short Beringian Standstill, Rapid Expansion, and early Population structure of Native American Founders. Calibrated phylogeny of Y haplogroup Q-L54.

- L54
  - Q-L330
  - Q-MPB001 (18.9 kya)
    - Q-CTS1780
    - Q-M930
      - Q-L804
      - Q-M3 (15.0 kya)
        - Q-Y4308
        - Q-M848 (14.9 kya)

The 2013 version of the polygenetic tree for haplogroup Q-L54 made by Thomas Krahn at the Genomic Research Center: Proposed Tree.

- L54
  - M3, L341.2
    - M19
    - M194
    - M199, P106, P292
    - PAGES104, PAGES126
    - PAGES131
    - L663
    - SA01
    - L766, L767
    - L883, L884, L885, L886, L887
    - L888, L889, L890, L891
  - L804, L805
    - L807
  - Z780
    - L191
    - L400, L401
  - L456
  - L568, L569, L570, L571
    - L567
    - L619.1
  - L330, L334
    - L329, L332, L333

== See also ==
- Human Y-chromosome DNA haplogroup

=== Y-DNA Q-M242 Subclades ===
- Q-M242
- Q-L275
- Q-L330
- Q-L717
- Q-L940
- Q-L53
- Q-L54
- Q-M120
- Q-B143
- Q-M25
- Q-M3
- Q-M323
- Q-M346
- Q-NWT01
- Q-P89.1
- Q-Z780
