= Mayan genetics =

The relationship of the Mayas to other indigenous peoples of the Americas has been assessed using traditional genetic markers. Mayas inhabited several parts of Mexico and Central America, including Chiapas, the northern lowlands of the Yucatán Peninsula, the southern lowlands and highlands of Guatemala, Belize, and parts of western El Salvador and Honduras. Genetic studies of the Maya people are reported to show higher levels of variation when compared to other groups.

Maya intra-population variation has been examined by means of the following tests: Human leukocyte antigen (HLA) polymorphisms, polymorphic Alu insertions, mitochondrial DNA (mtDNA), and Y chromosome data. The results indicate that ancestors of the Mayas made a finite number of entries into the Americas over the Bering land bridge.

== Human leukocyte antigen polymorphisms ==
In a study conducted by Michael H. Crawford, human leukocyte antigen loci were found to encode for major histocompatibility complexes. Allele frequencies were plotted for similarities using principal component analysis (PCA) for the HLA-A locus exhibited by the Mayan population. Results plot close similarities with the Inupiat people of Native Alaskan heritage, the Waiapi of central Brazil and the Tohono O'odham of northern Mexico. The HLA-B locus was examined in a PCA plot and indicates a proximity to the Zuni of southwest North America and the Aymara of southern South America.

== Transferrins, immunoglobulins and globulin allotypes ==
In a study conducted by Crawford, the transferrin, TF*B, allele was found to occur among the Lacandon Maya at a frequency of .019, among a group of mestizos (admixture of indigenous and Spanish people) of Tlaxcala (0.23), the Pima of the southwestern U.S. (0.32), the Chinantecos (0.28), and the Cora (0.05). Crawford states “The chance occurrence of the same mutation was acted upon by either the founder effect or selection”. The GM immunoglobulin allotype is inherited from both parents in units called haplotypes and carried amongst populations. The GM system diagnosis reveals population similarities and levels of admixture. Among the Maya population, the haplotypes present are: GM*A G (64.9), GM*X G (12.3) and GM*A T (4.4). GM frequencies of distinct Siberian groups has been documented. The Samoyeds and the Na-Dene express high frequencies of GM*X G and GM*A T. The Eskimo and Chukchi people display high frequencies of GM*A G and intermediate frequencies of GM*A T.

== Mitochondrial DNA (mtDNA) ==
=== mtDNA frequency distributions throughout the Americas ===
A study by Herrera et al. detailed genetic affinities between four groups of Maya: Mayas of Buctzotz and Yucatán, Kaqchikel people, Mayas of Campeche, and the K'iche' people. "Intra-population diversity was presented as four (APO, COL3A1, NBC4 and TCR) of the ten loci displayed allelic frequencies at fixation for the insertion or lack of insertion state". Three (APO, NBC4 and PV92) represent fixation of the insertion allele, while it was absent in non-native groups . Heterozygosity averages among the ten loci from the K'iche' at 0.133, the Buctzotz group at 0.249 and the Kaqchikel 0.171. Inter-population diversity was reported in reference to differences in allelic frequencies between the Mayans and other Native Americans, Europeans, Africans and Asians as (P<0.001).

=== mtDNA frequency distributions among Mayas ===
Inter-population variation within the Mayan group was identified in 18% of the total population. They were found to exhibit higher intra-population variation, except for loci D1, NBC4 and PV92, than comparable Native American populations. Comparing the phylogenetic relationships among the four Mayan subgroups Cakchique, Quiche, Campeche and Buctzotz; the Cakchiquel and Quiche cluster together. The Yucatán, Campeche and Buctzotz cluster within the same clade but different somewhat from the Guatemalan Mayans. The Alaskan Eskimos were intermediate between the Yucatáns and the Guatemalans.

In the study by Herrera, cluster analysis was employed to ascertain relative gene flow and/or differences in effective population size among the four groups of Maya. The Buctzotz and the Campeche reported a higher than average gene flow and/or effective population size. The Cakchiquel and the Quiche indicated by Herrera et al. display a lower than average gene flow and/or effective population size. The Buctzotz and Quiche were listed as being outliers. An AMOVA (Analysis of Molecular Variance) relates a “correlation or parallelism between genetic differentiation on one hand and geographical categories or linguistic types on the other.” The AMOVA compared inter-population and intra-population affinities. The only significant differences among the populations were in linguistics and genetics. "The high allelic frequency levels at or near fixation is the result of genetic drift, bottle neck events and/or the founder effect.” The founder effect was defined for the low heterozygosity amongst the Quiche and Cakchiquel. The Yucatán Mayans exhibited greater heterozygosity. This effect “was due to the extensive commerce and interaction with technologically advanced neighbors and compared with their southern counterparts was the accessibility to travel.” Both instances of variability among the Mayan groups suggest their genetic diversity and uniqueness. All pair-wise combinations display proportionate genetic differences. “The data may be indicative of the lack of genetic homogeneity among the four Mayan groups, especially when comparing the Guatemalan to the Yucatecan.”

In her 2011 doctoral dissertation, Anne Justice compared mtDNA data from literature and sampled two populations from Guatemala, the Chorti’ and Poqomchi’. Results found four mtDNA haplogroups A, B, C, and D..

Haplogroup A, (np) 16111 mutation of C to T and a Hae III Restriction enzyme site at np 633. mtDNA HincII morph-6 (site loss at np 13 259) and an AluI site gain at 13 262. Lineage A displays to be predominant in the north and nearly nonexistent in the south.

Haplogroup B is signified by a 9-bp Region V deletion. An HaeIII site at np 663 indicates polymorphism (haplotype AM6)[3]. The 9-bp deletion sets the parameters for lineage B, dominant in the south. Haplogroup B displays a 9-bp deletion with populations grouped from South America, Central America, North America, and across the Bering Strait into Siberia. There is a cline in frequency toward the north. Higher frequencies were reported in the south and were almost absent in the north. It has been suggested that the 9-bp deletion may have developed independently but it “appears to be on the same genetic background throughout the New World, Asia, and the Pacific, indicating a common origin.” The Mayas of Copán and Yucatec display an absence for the 9-bp deletion. It is proposed that the two groups have separate linguistics, and within the group there is a level of variation.

Haplogroup C has a signature loss of Hinc II restriction site at np 13259 and an Alu I restriction site added at np 13262. Haplogroup D has a loss of Alu I restriction site at np 5176. Lineages C and D were reported to have variable frequencies.

Haplogroup X is defined by an addition of Accl np 14465 and a mutation of T to C at np 16189, C to T at np 16278. The contemporary Mexican Maya displayed lineages A and B predominately while the Copán Maya were lineages C and D.

Identical mitochondrial DNA haplotypes S26 (AM43) and S13 (AM88) are expressed within both Siberian and Amerindian groups. "The S and AM designations represent the same haplotypes defined by the presence or absence of the specific restriction sites". A path of separation would have lasted over a period of 15,000 to 40,000 years.

== Y chromosome ==
=== Y-chromosome frequencies throughout the Americas ===
“The high resolution data on population history” that the Y chromosome exhibits make it a practical marker in the study of genetics. The Y chromosome is inherited from a father and is passed to his son, the sex chromosomes of males being XY and of females XX. The Y chromosome is 95% incapable of recombination. The tails of either end of the Y chromosome are pseudoautosomal, which pairs with the homologous portions of the X chromosome The chromosome itself hold 500 STRs, or repetitive sequences of copies of the genome that happen at a specific marker/place containing 3-8-bp repeats. Two haplogroups are presented: Q-M242 and C-M130. Haplogroup Q-M242, containing subgroups, is found in each tested population within the Americas. Haplogroup C-M130 is almost absent in Central and South America. "Haplogroup C-M130 is dated to have expanded ~30,000 to 25,000 BP and haplogroup Q-M242 ~18,000 to 15,000 BP".
