= Haplogroup Q-M25 =

Subgroup of a human Y-DNA haplogroup

- Possible time of origin: 24,300 [95% CI 22,100 <-> 26,700] years before present (YFull v6.02)
- Coalescence age: 16,400 [95% CI 14,900 <-> 18,000] years before present (YFull v6.02)
- Possible place of origin: Central Asia
- Ancestor: Q-F1096(F1215)
- Defining mutations: M25

Haplogroup Q-M25, also known as Q1a1b, is a subclade or branch of human Y-DNA haplogroup Q-F1096 (Q1a1), which is, in turn, a subclade of Q-MEH2 (Q1a). In human genetics, each Y-DNA haplogroup constitutes a biological paternal lineages back to a shared common male ancestor.

== Distribution ==
Q-M25 has descendants in modern populations across all of Eurasia. Only one detailed study on the Y-DNA on Turkmens from Turkmenistan has taken place. Haplogroup Q is found in minority Turkmen tribes living in Afghanistan at percentages of about 32%, and another study found that 42.6% of Iranian Turkmens have haplogroup Q-M25 (also known as Q1a1b).

=== The Americas ===
Q-M25 has not been detected in pre-Columbian populations in the Americas.

=== Asia ===
Q-M25 has been detected in the Northeast of East Asia, in South Asia, and across Central Asia. Though present at low frequencies, it may be one of the more widely distributed branches of Q-M242 in Asia.

Population	Sampling Location	Paper	N	Percentage	SNP Tested
Turkmen	Golestan, Iran	Grugni 2012	29/68	~42.6%	M25 & M143
Turkmen	Jawzjan, Afghanistan	Di Cristofaro 2013	23/74	~31.1%	M25 & M346/ (cf)Q1a3(currently Q1a2)=2/74 (Q total=33.8%)
Mixed	Central Asia & Siberia	Underhill 2000	6/184	~3.26%	M25 & M143
Kalmyk		Malyarchuk 2011	1/60	~1.70%	M25
Han	Shanxi	Zhong 2010	1/56	~1.79%	M25
Uyghur	Xinjiang	Zhong 2010	1/71	~1.41%	M25
Uyghur	Xinjiang	Zhong 2010	1/50	~2.00%	M25
Uzbek	Jawzjan, Afghanistan	Di Cristofaro 2013	1/94	~1.06%	M25
Mongol	Mongolia	Di Cristofaro 2013	1/160	~0.63%	M25

=== West Asia ===
The frequency of Q-M25 varies greatly across West Asia. An extreme peak is seen in the Turkmen of Golestan. Across the whole of Iran it varies from over 9 percent of the population in the north to only 2 to 3 percent of the population in the south. The frequency of Q-M25 drops to only about 1 percent of the population of Lebanon's Muslims, and it is absent from the non-Muslim population there. However, its presence in the Marsh Arabs(related to Sumer) of Iraq hints that Q-M25's West Asian history extends beyond a single localized recent founder.

Population	Sampling Location	Paper	N	Percentage	SNP Tested
Marsh Arabs		Al-Zahery 2011	1/143	~0.70%	M25/ (cf)Q1b-M378=2.1%
Iraqis		Al-Zahery 2011	0/154	~0.00%	M25/ (cf)Q1b-M378=1.9%
Iranians	Iran (North)	Regueiro 2006	3/33	~9.09%	M25
Iranians	Mazandaran	Di Cristofaro 2013	1/13	~7.69%	M25
Iranians	Iran (South)	Regueiro 2006	3/117	~2.56%	M25
Iranians	Esfahan	Di Cristofaro 2013	1/42	~2.38%	M25
Azeris	Iran (Azeri)	Grugni 2012	1/63	~1.60%	M25
Turkmens	Golestan	Grugni 2012	29/68	~42.6%	M25
Lebanese (Non-Muslim)	Lebanon	Zalloua 2008	0/482	~0.00%	M25
Lebanese (Muslim)	Lebanon	Zalloua 2008	4/432	~0.93%	M25

=== Europe ===
Q-M25 is present across modern Turkey and in Eastern Europe.

Population	Paper	N	Percentage	SNP Tested
East Anatolia	Cinnioglu 2004	1/82	~1.20%	M25

== Associated SNP's ==
Haplogroup Q-M25 is defined by the presence of the M25 Single Nucleotide Polymorphism (SNP) as well as the M143, L714, and L716 SNPs.

== Phylogenetic Tree ==
This is Thomas Krahn at the Genomic Research Center's Draft tree Proposed Tree for haplogroup Q-M25.

- Q-M25 M25, M143, L714, L716
  - Q-L712 L712
    - Q-L713 L697.2, L713, L715, M365.3

== See also ==
- Human Y-chromosome DNA haplogroup

=== Y-DNA Q-M242 Subclades ===
- Q-M242
- Q-L275
- Q-L330
- Q-L717
- Q-L940
- Q-L53
- Q-L54
- Q-M120
- Q-B143
- Q-M25
- Q-M3
- Q-M323
- Q-M346
- Q-NWT01
- Q-P89.1
- Q-Z780
