= Haplogroup Q-P89.1 =

Human Y-chromosome DNA haplogroup

- Possible time of origin: Insufficient data
- Possible place of origin: Asia or Beringia
- Ancestor: Q-MEH2
- Defining mutations: P89.1

Haplogroup Q-P89.1 is a subclade of Y-DNA Haplogroup Q-MEH2. Haplogroup Q-P89.1 is defined by the presence of the P89.1 Single Nucleotide Polymorphism (SNP). In 2010, Q-P89.1 was reclassified as "private" and removed from the haplotree.

== Distribution ==
Q-P89.1 has descendants in the Northwest Territory of modern Canada. It was in pre-Columbian American populations that it was discovered.

=== The Americas ===
Q-P89.1 is present in pre-Columbian populations in the Canadian Northwest.

| Population | Paper | N | Percentage | SNP Tested |
|---|---|---|---|---|
| Gwich’in | Dulik 2012 | 0/33 | ~0.00% | P89.1 |
| Tłįchǫ | Dulik 2012 | 1/37 | ~2.70% | P89.1 |
| Inuvialuit | Dulik 2012 | 0/56 | ~0.00% | P89.1 |
| Inupiat | Dulik 2012 | 0/5 | ~0.00% | P89.1 |

=== Asia ===
Because samples from Asia have only sporadically been tested for this lineage, its frequency there is uncertain.

== Associated SNPs ==
Q-P89.1 is currently defined by only the P89.1 SNP.

== See also ==
- Human Y-chromosome DNA haplogroup

=== Y-DNA Q-M242 Subclades ===
- Q-M242
- Q-L275
- Q-L330
- Q-L717
- Q-L940
- Q-L53
- Q-L54
- Q-M120
- Q-B143
- Q-M25
- Q-M3
- Q-M323
- Q-M346
- Q-NWT01
- Q-P89.1
- Q-Z780
