= Haplogroup Q-Z780 =

Subclade of the Y-DNA Haplogroup Q-L54

- Possible place of origin: Eurasia or North America
- Ancestor: Q-L54
- Descendants: Q-L191 and Q-L400
- Defining mutations: Z780

Haplogroup Q-Z780 is a subclade of the Y-DNA Haplogroup Q-L54. Q-Z780 is defined by the presence of the Z780 Single Nucleotide Polymorphism (SNP).

== Distribution ==
Q-Z780 has descendants across much of the pre-Columbian Americas. It is the second most common branch of Q-M242 in the Americas. The Anzick child who lived 12,600 years ago and was found in the state of Montana, has a Y-chromosome that was initially determined to Q-L54*(xM3) but is now assigned, along with modern Native American sample, to a subclade of Q-Z780, Q-FGC47532, or to Q1b-M971.

== Associated SNPs ==
Q-Z780 is currently defined by the Z780 SNP.

== Subgroups ==
This is Thomas Krahn at the Genomic Research Center's Draft tree Proposed Tree for haplogroup Q-Z780.

- Q-Z780 Z780
  - Q-L191 L191
  - Q-L400 L400, L401

== See also ==
- Human Y-chromosome DNA haplogroup

=== Y-DNA Q-M242 subclades ===
- Q-M242
- Q-L275
- Q-L330
- Q-L717
- Q-L940
- Q-L53
- Q-L54
- Q-M120
- Q-B143
- Q-M25
- Q-M3
- Q-M323
- Q-M346
- Q-NWT01
- Q-P89.1
- Q-Z780
