= Haplogroup Q-M3 =

Subclade of Y-DNA haplogroup Q-L54

- Possible time of origin: 10,000-15,000 years ago
- Possible place of origin: Beringia: Either East Asia or North America
- Ancestor: Q-L54
- Descendants: Q-M19, Q-M194, Q-M199, Q-PAGES104, Q-PAGES131, Q-L663, Q-SA01, Q-L766, Q-L883, and Q-L888
- Defining mutations: M3 (rs3894)

Haplogroup Q-M3 (Y-DNA) is a Y-chromosome DNA haplogroup. Haplogroup Q-M3 is a subclade of Haplogroup Q-L54. Haplogroup Q-M3 was previously known as Haplogroup Q3; currently Q-M3 is Q1b1a1a below Q1b-M346.

In 1996 the research group at Stanford University headed by Dr. Peter Underhill first discovered the SNP that was to become known as M3. At the time, it was called DYS191. Later studies completed the genetic bridge by determining that Q-M3 was related to Q-M242-bearing populations who traveled through Central Asia to East Asia.

== Origin and distribution ==
Haplogroup Q-M3 is one of the Y-Chromosome haplogroups linked to the indigenous peoples of the Americas (over 90% of indigenous people in Meso & South America). Today, such lineages also include other Q-M242 branches (Q-M346, Q-L54, Q-P89.1, Q-NWT01, and Q-Z780), and haplogroup C-M130 branches (C-M217 and C-P39), which are almost exclusively found in North America. Haplogroup Q-M3 is defined by the presence of the (M3) single-nucleotide polymorphism (SNP). Q-M3 occurred on the Q-L54 lineage roughly 10-15 thousand years ago as the migration into the Americas was underway. There is some debate as to on which side of the Bering Strait this mutation occurred, but it definitely happened in the ancestors of the indigenous peoples of the Americas.

=== The Americas ===
Populations carrying Q-M3 are widespread throughout the Americas. Since the discovery of Q-M3, several subclades of Q-M3 bearing populations have been discovered in the Americas as well. An example is in South America where some populations have a high prevalence of SNP M19 which defines subclade Q-M19. M19 has been detected in 59% of Amazonian Ticuna men and in 10% of Wayuu men. Subclades Q-M19 and Q-M199 appear to be unique to South American populations and suggests that population isolation and perhaps even the establishment of tribes began soon after migration into the Americas. The Kennewick Man has a Y chromosome that belongs to the most common sub-clade Q1b1a1a-M3 while the Anzick's Y chromosome belongs to the minor Q1b1a2-M971 lineage.

=== Asia ===
Q-M3 is present in some Siberian populations in Asia. It is unclear whether these are remnants of the founding lineage or evidence of back-migrations from Beringia to East Asia.

Population	Paper	N	Percentage	SNP Tested
Evens	Malyarchuk 2011	2/63	~3.2%	M3

=== Europe ===
The Q-M3 lineage has not been detected in the European population.

=== Subclade distribution ===
Q-M19 M19 This lineage is found among Indigenous South Americans, such as the Ticuna and the Wayuu. Origin: South America approximately 5,000 to 10,000 years ago.

Q-M194 It has only been found in South American populations.

Q-M199 This lineage has only been found in South American populations.

Q-PAGES104 This lineage was discovered by the research group at the Whitehead Institute headed by Dr. David C. Page. Only limited demographic information is known.

Q-PAGES131 This lineage was discovered by the research group at the Whitehead Institute headed by Dr. David C. Page. Only limited demographic information is known.

Q-L663 This lineage was discovered by citizen scientists. It is linked to indigenous populations in Central Mexico and has been associated with the Otomies (Hñähñús, as they self-identify) from Hidalgo, Mexico (Gómez et al, 2021). Q-L663's paternal line was formed around 550 BCE. The man who is the most recent common ancestor of this line is estimated to have been born around 1250 CE. Extensive research on this haplogroup is being conducted by members of the New Mexico Genealogical Society, with at least 16 NGS Y-DNA tests as of 2023. The earliest known genealogical records for a Q-L663 descendant were for a man named Nicolás de Espinosa, a native of the Villa de los Lagos, Nueva Galicia, Mexico, who was born circa 1673.

Gómez, R., Vilar, M.G., Meraz-Ríos, M.A., Véliz, D., Zúñiga, G., Hernández-Tobías, E.A., Figueroa-Corona, M., Owings, A.C., Gaieski, J.B., Schurr, T.G., (2021). Y chromosome diversity in Aztlan descendants and its implications for the history of Central Mexico, iScience, 24 (5). https://doi.org/10.1016/j.isci.2021.102487

Q-SA01 This lineage was discovered by the research group headed by Dr. Theodore G. Schurr.

Q-L766 This lineage was discovered by citizen scientists. It may be linked to indigenous populations in the Southwestern United States and Mexico.

Q-L883 This lineage was discovered by citizen scientists.

Q-L888 This lineage was discovered by citizen scientists.

== Associated SNPs ==
Q-M3 is defined by the SNPs M3 and L341.2.

== Q-M3 Phylogeny and Subgroups ==
Current status of the polygenetic tree for Q-M3 is published by pinotti et al. in the article Y Chromosome Sequences Reveal a Short Beringian Standstill, Rapid Expansion, and early Population structure of Native American Founders (2018). Calibrated phylogeny of Y haplogroup for Q-M3 and its relation to the branches within Q-L54.

- L54
  - Q-L330
  - Q-MPB001 (18.9 kya)
    - Q-CTS1780
    - Q-M930 (15.0-17.0 kya) Ancient Beringians
      - Q-L804 (Scandinavian)
      - Q-M3 (Native American, 15.0 kya)
        - Q-Y4308
        - Q-M848 (14.9 kya)
          - Q-B48
          - Q-CTS11357
            - Q-M825
          - Q-MPB073
          - Q-MPB015
          - Q-MPB115
          - Q-Z6658
          - Q-Z5906
          - Q-Z19357
          - Q-MPB139
          - Q-MPB138
          - Q-M848*

In 2013 Thomas Krahn at the Genomic Research Center's made the following phylogentic Proposed Tree for haplogroup Q-M3.

- L54
  - M3, L341.2
    - M19
    - M194
    - M199, P106, P292
    - PAGES104, PAGES126
    - PAGES131
    - L663
    - SA01
    - L766, L767
    - L883, L884, L885, L886, L887
    - L888, L889, L890, L891

== Popular culture ==
American actress Jessica Alba's father, who is of Mexican descent, belongs to Haplogroup Q-M3. Her father partook in Henry Louis Gates' genealogy series Finding Your Roots.

== See also ==
- Human Y-chromosome DNA haplogroup

=== Y-DNA Q-M242 subclades ===
- Q-M242
- Q-L275
- Q-L330
- Q-L717
- Q-L940
- Q-L53
- Q-L54
- Q-M120
- Q-B143
- Q-M25
- Q-M3
- Q-M323
- Q-M346
- Q-NWT01
- Q-P89.1
- Q-Z780
