= Haplogroup Q-M346 =

Human Y-chromosome DNA haplogroup

- Possible time of origin: 24,100-27,900 BP
- Possible place of origin: Eurasia
- Ancestor: Q-MEH2
- Descendants: Q-L54, Q-M323
- Defining mutations: L56, L57, M346

Haplogroup Q-M346 is a subclade of Y-DNA Haplogroup Q. Haplogroup Q-M346 is defined by the presence of the M346 Single Nucleotide Polymorphism (SNP).

== Origin and distribution ==
Q-M346 was discovered in Central Asia and announced in Sengupta 2006. A latter paper suggested that its ancestral state was isolated to India, but this has since been refuted by its presence in West Asia, Europe and the Americas.

=== Asia ===
Q-M346 has a wide distribution across much of Asia.

Population	Paper	N	Percentage	SNP Tested
Altaians (Russia - Siberia)	Malyarchuk 2011	23/89	~25.8%	M346
Khakassians (Russia - Siberia)	Malyarchuk 2011	4/64	~6.3%	M346
Todjins (Russia - Siberia)	Malyarchuk 2011	10/26	~38.5%	M346
Tuvinians (Russia - Siberia)	Malyarchuk 2011	41/108	~38.0%	M346
Soyot/Sojots (Russia - Siberia)	Malyarchuk 2011	2/28	~7.1%	M346
Kalmyks	Malyarchuk 2011	1/60	~1.7%	M346
Halba	Sengupta 2006	1/21	~4.76%	M346
Makrani	Sengupta 2006	1/20	~5.00%	M346
Pathan	Sengupta 2006	2/21	~5.00%	M346
Brahmin (Uttar Pradesh, India)	Sengupta 2006	1/14	~7.14%	M346
Vellalar (South India)	Sengupta 2006	1/31	~3.23%	M346
Pakistan	Abu-Amero 2009	3/176	~1.70%	M346
Kazakhs (Southwest Altai)	Dulik 2011	1/30	~3.33%	M346
Chelkan (Russia - Siberia)	Dulik 2012	15/25	~60.00%	M346
Tubalar Russia - Siberia]	Dulik 2012	10/27	~37.00%	M346

=== The Americas ===
In the Americas, the founding paternal lineages include those who are Q-M346 but do not belong to the Q-M3 lineage.

Population	Paper	N	Percentage	SNP Tested
Enxet	Bailliet 2009	7/24	~29.20%	M346
Ayoreo	Bailliet 2009	2/9	~22.20%	M346
Wichi	Bailliet 2009	1/120	~0.80%	M346
Mocovi	Bailliet 2009	2/40	~5.00%	M346
Mapuche	Bailliet 2009	1/26	~3.80%	M346
Salta	Bailliet 2009	3/72	~4.80%	M346
Cordoba	Bailliet 2009	1/156	~0.60%	M346
Huilliche	Bailliet 2009	1/26	~3.80%	M346
La Paz	Bailliet 2009	1/29	~3.40%	M346
Tarija	Bailliet 2009	4/72	~5.50%	M346

== Associated SNPs ==
Q-M346 is marked by the presence of the M346 SNP. Since the discovery of M346 several additional SNPs have been found to also be associated with Q-M346. These SNP's include: L56 and L57. These SNPs appear to be "parallel" to M346.

== Subgroups ==
This is Thomas Krahn's—of the Genomic Research Center—draft tree, Proposed Tree, for haplogroup Q-M346. The first three levels of subclades are shown. Additional detail is provided on the linked branch article pages.

- Q-MEH2 MEH2, L472, L528
  - Q-M346 M346, L56, L57, L474, L892, L942
    - Q-M323 M323
    - Q-L717 L717, L718
    - Q-L940 L940
      - Q-L527 L527, L529, L639
      - Q-L933 L933, L938, L941
    - Q-L53 L53, L55, L213, L331, L475, L476
      - Q-L54 L54

== See also ==
- Human Y-chromosome DNA haplogroup

=== Y-DNA Q-M242 subclades ===
- Q-M242
- Q-L275
- Q-L330
- Q-L717
- Q-L940
- Q-L53
- Q-L54
- Q-M120
- Q-B143
- Q-M25
- Q-M3
- Q-M323
- Q-M346
- Q-NWT01
- Q-P89.1
- Q-Z780
