= Haplogroup Q-NWT01 =

Human Y-chromosome DNA haplogroup

- Possible time of origin: 20,000-25,000 years before present
- Possible place of origin: Asia or Beringia
- Ancestor: Q-MEH2
- Descendants: Q-M120, Q-B143
- Defining mutations: F746/NWT01

Haplogroup Q-NWT01 is a subclade of Y-DNA Haplogroup Q-MEH2. Haplogroup Q-NWT01 is defined by the presence of the F746/NWT01 Single Nucleotide Polymorphism (SNP).

== Distribution ==
Q-NWT01 has descendants in the Northwest Territories of modern Canada. It was in these populations that it was discovered.

=== The Americas ===
Q-NWT01 is present in pre-Columbian populations in the Canadian Northwest. However, subsequent genetic studies have indicated that samples previously reported as Q-NWT01 within Eskimo-Aleut populations are more likely to belong to the Q-B143 subclade. It also has been found in a specimen of the Saqqaq culture of prehistoric Greenland.

Population	Paper	N	Percentage	SNP Tested
Gwichʼin	Dulik 2012	0/33	0.00%	NWT01
Tłı̨chǫ	Dulik 2012	1/37	~2.70%	NWT01
Inuvialuit	Dulik 2012	25/56	~44.64%	NWT01
Iñupiat	Dulik 2012	3/5	60.00%	NWT01

=== Asia ===
Because few samples from Asia have been tested for this lineage, its frequency there is uncertain. However, haplogroup Q-M120 is spread widely in Asia, from Azerbaijan and Kalmykia in the west to Japan in the east and from Mongolia in the north to Brunei in the south, and the entire Q-M120 clade has been determined to be a subclade of Q-NWT01. In addition, Y-DNA that belongs to the Q-B143 subclade like the Saqqaq specimen from Greenland has been found in Koryaks.

== Ancient DNA ==
Upper Paleolithic individual from the Afontova Gora 2 site, dating to approximately 17,000 years ago and representing the Ancient North Eurasian ancestry, is the earliest known member of haplogroup Q1a1-F746.

A 2023 study published in Nature found that haplogroup Q1a1-F746/NWT01 was highly prevalent among individuals from the Murzihinskiy II and Yuzhny Oleny archaeological sites in western Russia, dating back to c. 6,500 and 8,200 years ago, respectively. These individuals exhibited genetic similarity to Eastern Hunter-Gatherers, suggesting that this haplogroup was widespread among early hunter-gatherer populations in the region.

== Associated SNPs ==
Q-NWT01 is currently defined by only the NWT01 SNP. As part of the National Geographic Geno 2.0 test, this SNP is labeled F746. This is because it was independently discovered in a Q-M120 sample sequenced with next generation technology. It can also be called PR4083 as it was labeled in a primate sample sequenced at Family Tree DNA's Genomic Research Center.

== Phylogenetic Tree ==
- Q (M242)
  - Q1 (F903/L472)
    - Q1a (F1096)
      - Q1a1 (F746/NWT01)
        - Q1a1a (M120)
        - Q1a1b (B143/YP1469)

Source: ISOGG 2018.

== See also ==
- Human Y-chromosome DNA haplogroup

=== Y-DNA Q-M242 subclades ===
- Q-M242
- Q-L275
- Q-L330
- Q-L717
- Q-L940
- Q-L53
- Q-L54
- Q-M120
- Q-B143
- Q-M25
- Q-M3
- Q-M323
- Q-M346
- Q-NWT01
- Q-P89.1
- Q-Z780
