= Haplogroup Q-B143 =

Human Y-chromosome DNA haplogroup

- Possible time of origin: 15,000 years BP
- Possible place of origin: Eurasia
- Ancestor: Q-NWT01
- Defining mutations: B143

Haplogroup Q-B143 is a subclade of Y-DNA Haplogroup Q-NWT01. It is defined by the presence of the B143 Single Nucleotide Polymorphism (SNP).

== Distribution ==
Q-B143 is primarily found among the indigenous peoples of the North American Arctic, Greenland, and Northeastern Siberia. It exhibits high frequencies among the Eskimos of Alaska, Canada, and Greenland. It also has been found in the Koryaks, Chukchi and Yukaghirs.

Recent studies indicate that the previously reported Q-NWT01 in Greenland populations is more likely to belong to the subclade Q-B143.

The oldest known example of Q-B143 was found in an Ancient Paleo-Siberian individual from the Duvanniy Yar site in northeastern Siberia, dating back approximately 10,000 years. A male from the Saqqaq culture, discovered in Greenland and dated to around 4,000 years ago, has been found to belong to the Q-B143 lineage.

== Associated SNPs ==
Q-B143 is currently defined by the B143 SNP.

== Subgroups ==
- Q-F746/NWT01 F746/NWT01
  - Q-B143 B143/YP1469
    - Q-BZ284 B284, Z36039, Z36041, Z43867
    - Q-BZ280 B280, Z36043
      - Q-Z36044 Z36044, Z36045, Z34065
      - Q-BZ281 B281, Z36047, Z36048, Z36049, Z36050
        - Q-BZ282 B282, Z36051, Z36052

Source: ISOGG 2018.

== See also ==
- Human Y-chromosome DNA haplogroup
