= Eushta Tatars =

Subgroup of Tom Tatars

яушталар, yaushtalar

Regions with significant populations
- Russia: 300-400: Tomsk Oblast

Languages
- Tom dialect of Siberian Tatar, Russian

Religion
- Sunni Islam

Related ethnic groups
- Other Siberian Tatars, Selkups

The Eushta Tatars (Siberian Tatar: яушталар, yaushtalar, Russian: Эуштинцы) are one of the three subgroups of Tom Tatar group of Siberian Tatars. Eushta mainly inhabit the lower reaches of the Tom river in Tomsk oblast. Their historical and cultural centre is the Eushta village. Eushta are especially closely related to Chat Tatars. Their historical center was the township of Toian.

Eushta Tatars consist of three sub-groups: Eushta Tatars, Basandai Tatars, Evaga Tatars. They speak Eushta-Chat variant of the Tom dialect of the Siberian Tatar language.

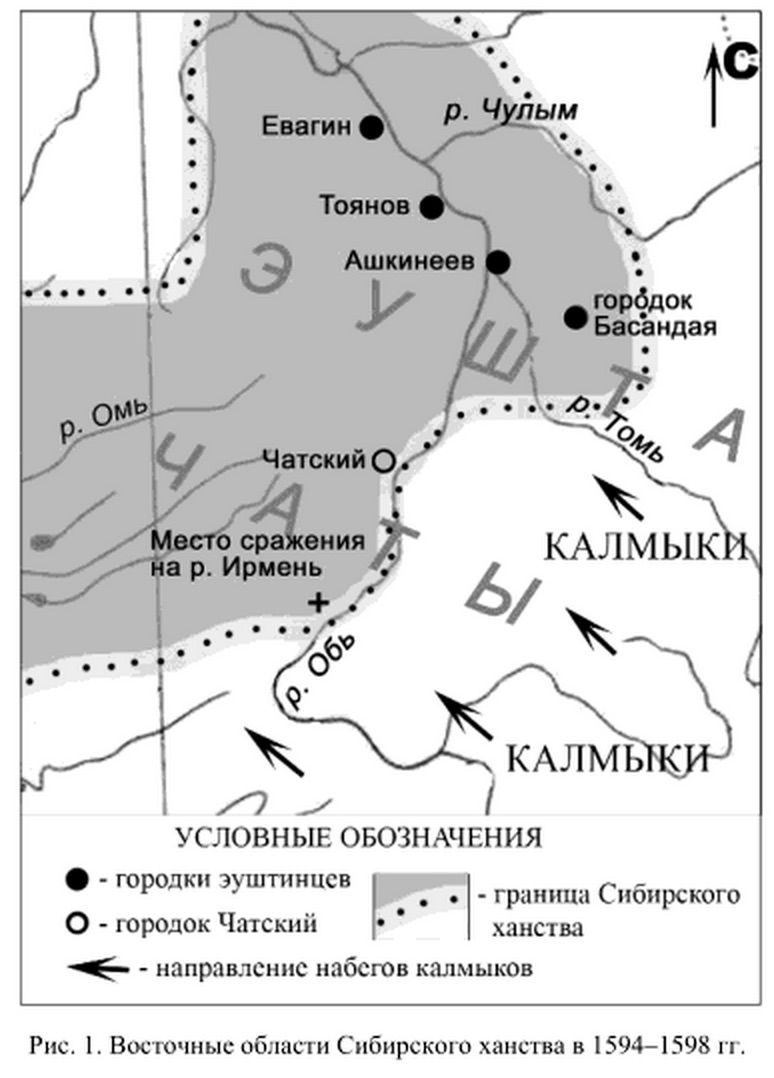
Eastern region of the Khanate of Sibir in 1594-1598

== History ==
Eushta Tatars are considered to be originally Samoyedic Selkup inhabitants of western Siberia, who were greatly influenced by Turkic peoples and lately Turkicised. In the beginning there were migrations from Altai. Yenisei Kyrgyz and Tyolyos tribes formed a role in their ethnogenesis. In 9th and 10th centuries Kimeks arrived in the region, from which the Kipchaks derived, who also had impact on Eushta Tatars.

During the 15th and 16th centuries, the Eushta were under the rule of the Sibir Khanate. When Russians first came into contact with the Eushta, they numbered around 800 people.

Eushta Tatars adopted Islam at the middle of the 19th century.

== Genetics ==
According to Valikhova L.V. et al. (2022), the main Y-DNA haplogroups that have been observed among a sample of Tatars from the village of Eushta are R1b1a1a1b-Y20768(xY20784) (35.3%), R1a1a1b2a2b-Z2122 (20.6%), Q1b1b-YP4004 (17.6%), R1a1a1b2-CTS9754 (14.7%), and C2a1a2a. The authors have reported that these lineages among the Tatars of Eushta village are closely related to lineages observed among Teleut, Khakas, Shor, Chelkan, Tubalar, and Tuvan populations, all of which are Turkic-speaking populations of South Central Siberia.
