= Adai =

Adai may refer to:

- Adai people, Extinct Native American people from Louisiana and Texas
  - Adai language, their language, now extinct
- A type of dosa, a South Indian crêpe
- Adai (tribe), a Kazakh tribe in the Bayuly tribal confederation of the Junior jüz, numbering ca. 400–500,000
- Adai Khan, Mongol khan of Northern Yuan Dynasty
- Adai, FATA, a town in the Federally Administered Areas of Pakistan
- Adai Caddo Indians of Louisiana, state-recognized tribe
