= Haplogroup C-M48 =

Human Y-chromosome DNA haplogroup

- Possible time of origin: 14,700 [95% CI 13,300 <-> 16,100] years before present 15,557 [95% CI 14,443 <-> 16,732] years before present
- Coalescence age: 12,131 [95% CI 10,916 <-> 13,363] years before present 2,750 ± 1,370 years before present 3,500 [95% CI 300–19,700] years before present 3,800 [95% CI 3,100 <-> 4,600] years before present 5,940 ± 2,900 years (evolutionary mutation rate) or 1,630 ± 800 years (genealogical mutation rate) 10,800 ± 2,300 years ago or 9,300 ± 3,300 years ago
- Possible place of origin: perhaps Mongolia or the Lake Baikal region
- Ancestor: C-M217
- Defining mutations: M48, M77, M86
- Highest frequencies: Oroqen 42%-68%, Evenks 44%-71%, Evenks 27%-70%, Udegey 60%, Negidal 20%-100%, Evens 5%-61%, Kazakhs 42%-63%, Itelmen 39%, Ulchi/Nanai 38%, Kalmyks 37%-45%, Nivkhs 35%, Ulchi 35%, Koryaks 33%, Yukaghir 23%, Mongols (Uriankhai 33%, Zakhchin 30%, Khalkh 15%, Khoton 10%), Dolgans 12%, Hezhe 11%, Tuvans 9% [6%-20%], Kyrgyz 7% [5%-12%]

Haplogroup C-M48 also known as C2a1a2 is a Y-chromosome DNA haplogroup.

It is found frequently amongst members of Central Asian and Siberian peoples, such as the Evenks, Evens, Tom Tatars, Ulchi, Kazakhs, Koryaks, Mongols (especially Oirats, such as Kalmyks, Zakhchin, Uriankhai, and the population of northwest Mongolia in general), Yukaghirs, and western Buryats.

Haplogroup C-M48 also has been found occasionally in some ethnic groups outside its typical range in Siberia and Central Asia, such as Japanese (2/53 C-M86 Kyushu, 1/70 C-M86 Tokushima, 0/61 C-M86 Shizuoka, 0/45 C-M217 Okinawa, 0/26 C-M217 Aomori, 0/4 C-M86 Ainu), Tibetans (4/479 C-M48 Xizang, 0/52 C-M48 Qinghai), Bhutanese (1/21 C-M86/M77), Ossetians (1/21 C-M48 South Ossetians), Adyghe (1/154 C-M48), and Russians (1/406 C-M77), some of whom exhibit divergent Y-STR haplotypes.

== Subclades ==
- C2a1a2 (M48) - TMRCA 14,540 ybp
  - C2a1a2a (M86, M77) - TMRCA 4,280 ybp
    - C2a1a2a1~
      - C2a1a2a1a (B469) - TMRCA 2,350 ybp; China (Mongols in Inner Mongolia, Liaoning, Jilin, Qinghai, and Jiangsu, Manchus in Liaoning, Jilin, Heilongjiang, Beijing, Inner Mongolia, Shandong, and Jiangsu, Hans in Liaoning, Jilin, Heilongjiang, Beijing, and Hubei, Uyghurs in Xinjiang)
        - C2a1a2a1a1 (B87)
          - C2a1a2a1a1a (B89) - Even (Dzhigda), Evenk (Inner Mongolia, Russia), Oroqens (Heihe), Mongols (Hulunbuir), Buryat (Russia)
      - C2a1a2a1b (B80) - TMRCA 1,640 ybp; Russia (Evens), China (Evenks, Oroqens, Manchu, Fuyu Kyrgyz)
        - C2a1a2a1b1 (B471)
        - C2a1a2a1b2 (B81)
          - C2a1a2a1b2b (B82)
    - C2a1a2a2 (F6379/Y12792) - TMRCA 3,030 ybp; Kyrgyz (China), Uyghur (Aksu City)
      - C2a1a2a2a (F5485/SK1064/Y12825) - TMRCA 2,170 ybp; Late Medieval Mongolia (Karnikovyn 1 from Karnikovyn Am, 1300 - 1400 CE)
        - C2a1a2a2a1 (Y15844) - Russia (Siberian Tatar in Tomsk Oblast, Chat Tatar, Kazakhstan (Kazakhs, especially the Bayuly and Alimuly tribes of the Alshyns), Uzbekistan (Karakalpaks), Kyrgyzstan (Kyrgyz), China (Xibo in Ili)
          - C2a1a2a2a1a (Y15552)
            - C2a1a2a2a1a1 (BY18743/Y33019)
            - C2a1a2a2a1a2 (MPB421/Y22661)
            - C2a1a2a2a1a3 (Y17342)
        - C2a1a2a2a2 (SK1066) - Mongols (Ölöd from Nilka County, Torghut from Jinghe County, Torghut from Kalmykia, Torghut from Mongolia, Mongol from Bole, Khoshut from Alxa Left Banner, Khoshut from Kalmykia, Xinjiang Kalmyk, Derbet from Kalmykia, Mongol from Hulunbuir, Buzava from Kalmykia), Tsaatan from Mongolia, Kazakhs (Naiman from China and Kazakhstan, Bayuly, Töleñgıt-Kalmak), Kyrgyz (Kyrgyzstan, China), Uyghur from Ili, China (Baoji)
        - C2a1a2a2a3 (F12970/Y15849)
          - C2a1a2a2a3a (F9936) - Russia (Kazan Tatar in Tatarstan), Mongolia (Tsagaan 2 from 1300 to 1400 CE Dornod)
            - C2a1a2a2a3a1 (F9766) - Russia (Tuvan), China (Kazakh), Kazakhstan (Kerey-Abak-Merkit, Naiman-Karatai), Mongolia
      - C2a1a2a2b (F8472/PH36) - TMRCA 2,690 ybp; China (Xi'an, Jiangsu Manchu, Linxia Hui, etc.), Turkey, Bhutan
  - C2a1a2b (B90) - TMRCA 4,992 ybp, TMRCA 4,600 ybp
    - C2a1a2b1 (B91) - TMRCA 3,812 ybp; Koryaks
      - C2a1a2b1b (B92)

=== C-B90 ===
Karmin et al. 2015 have found a divergent branch of C-M48, which they have named C3c2-B90 and which ISOGG has named C2b1a2b-B90, in three Koryaks and one Evenk. Although the M48 and M77 SNPs have long been considered to be phylogenetically equivalent, marking the same clade of the human Y-DNA phylogeny, the C3c2-B90 clade has been found to be positive for the M48 mutation, but negative for the M77 mutation.

==== C-B91 ====
C-B91 is a subclade of C-B90 that has been found in Koryaks. It subsumes the C-B92 and C-B94 subclades. Karmin et al. 2015 have found Y-DNA belonging to C-B92 in two Koryaks who they have estimated to share a most recent common ancestor 594 [95% CI 285 <-> 939] years before present. The two Koryaks in C-B92 have been estimated to share a most recent common ancestor with a Koryak who belongs to the C-B94 subclade 3,812 [95% CI 3,005 <-> 4,654] years before present.

==== C-B93 ====
C-B93 is a subclade of C-B90 that has been found in 7.7% (4/52) of a sample of Ulchi and in one Evenk. It has been estimated to share a most recent common ancestor with C-B91 of the Koryaks 4,992 [95% CI 4,188 <-> 5,732] years before present.

=== C-M77 ===
Karmin et al. 2015 have estimated the coalescence age of C-M77, which they have named C3c1a-M77 and which ISOGG has named C2b1a2a-M86/M77, to be 2,804 [95% CI 2,228 <-> 3,431] years before present based on their three examples of C-B469 and five examples of C-B80 Y-DNA.

==== C-B469 ====
C-B469 is a subclade of C-M77. Y-DNA that belongs to the C-B469 clade, which has been named C2b1a2a1a-B469 by ISOGG, has been found in a Zakhchin Mongolian, an Evenk, and a Buryat. The Evenk individual and the Buryat individual both belong to the C-B87 subclade and have been estimated to share a most recent common ancestor 1,792 [95% CI 1,255 <-> 2,376] years before present. Those two individuals have been estimated to share a most recent common ancestor with the Zakhchin individual, who belongs to the C-B470 subclade, 2,562 [95% CI 2,003 <-> 3,161] years before present.

C-B469 also has been found in HGDP01250, a Y-DNA sample obtained from a Xibo in China as part of the Human Genome Diversity Project, and in an Even from Nelkan, Khabarovsk Krai.

Balanovska et al. (2018) found C-F13686, a subclade that may be phylogenetically equivalent to C-B469, in 7.7% (4/52) of a sample of Ulch people.

Balinova et al. (2019) observed Y-DNA that belongs to C-B469 in 10.1% (7/69) of a sample of Derbet Kalmyks from Russia, 2.5% (1/40) of a sample of Derbet Mongols from western Mongolia, and 1.7% (1/58) of a sample of Torgut Kalmyks from Russia.

===== C-B470 =====
C-B470 is a subclade of C-B469. This subclade has been observed in a Zakhchin and in an Ulch.

===== C-B87 =====
C-B87 is a subclade of C-B469. The time to most recent common ancestor between C-B87 and C-B470 (which includes the Y-DNA of a Zakhchin Mongolian individual and an Ulch individual) has been estimated to be 2,562 [95% CI 2,003 <-> 3,161] years before present.

C-B87(xB89) Y-DNA, which belongs to C-B87 but does not belong to its C-B89 subclade, has been found in a Buryat (C-B88) and in a Xibo.

====== C-B89 ======
C-B89 is a subclade of C-B87 that is known from the Y-DNA of an Even from Nelkan, Khabarovsk Krai and the Y-DNA of an Evenk.

==== C-B80 ====
Y-DNA that belongs to this clade, which has been named C2b1a2a1b-B80 by ISOGG, has been found in five Evens (four from Magadan Oblast and one from Sakha Republic). These five Even members of C-B80 have been estimated to share a most recent common ancestor 1,674 [95% CI 1,190 <-> 2,205] years before present.
