= Zabolotnie Tatars =

Subgroup of Tobol-Irtysh Tatars

Сас татарлар, Sas tatarlar

Regions with significant populations
- Russia: ca. 1800: Tyumen Oblast

Languages
- Tobol-Irtysh dialect of Siberian Tatar, Russian

Religion
- Sunni Islam

Related ethnic groups
- Other Siberian Tatars, Khakas, Shors, Altai, Nenets, Khanty, Mansi

Zabolotnie (Yaskolbinsk) Tatars (Siberian Tatar: сас татарлар, romanized: sas tatarlar) are a subgroup of the Tobol-Irtysh group of Siberian Tatars. They live in the North-West parts of the Tobolsky district, Tyumen oblast, mainly in the Achir and Laytamak rural settlements.

Zabolotnie Tatars traditionally practiced hunting and fishing.

== Origins ==
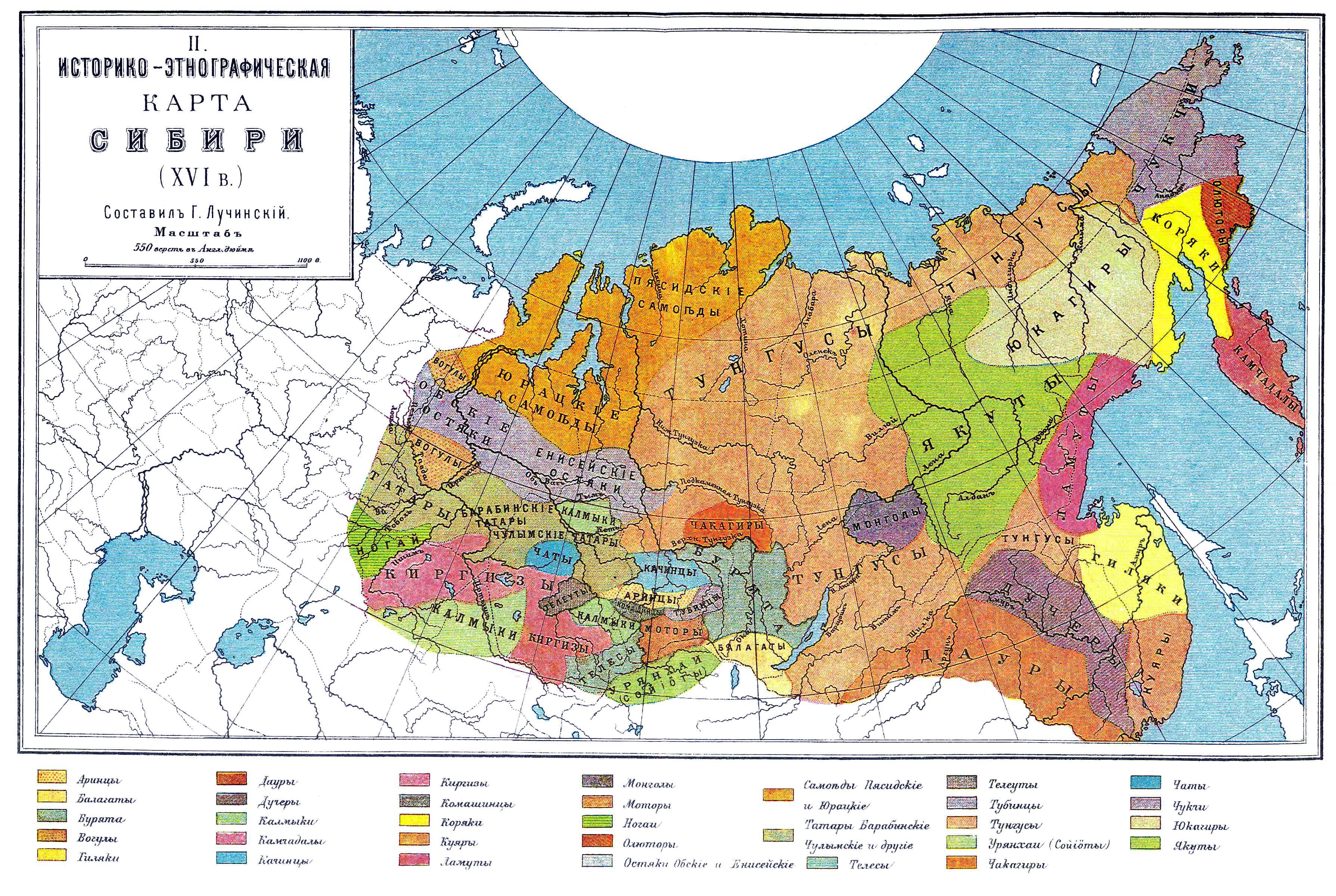
Peoples of Siberia in the 16th century.

Their traditional areas of settlement are separated from Tobolsk, the Russian and Siberian Tatar settlements by the Irtysh river, by impassable swamps which is the reason for their name in the Russian language (literally, Tatars who live behind the swamps). This separation also helped them to preserve some elements of their traditional culture, which has been lost by other Siberian groups. One of the characteristics of Zabolotnie Tatars is a lack of mixing with Volga Tatars and Siberian Bukharans, unlike some other subgroups of Siberian Tatars.

== Groups ==
They are divided into three local sub-groups:

- Yaskolba Tatars
- Koshuk Tatars
- Tabara Tatars.

== Genetics ==
Eight Y-DNA haplotypes were detected among Zabolotnie Tatars. A research found that 62% of Zabolotnie Tatar males belong to N1b-P43, following by N1c-LLYY22 10% and N-M231 10%. Other, less widespread haplogroups are O3-M122 4%, R1b1-M73 4%, J2b-M12 2%, R1a-M198 1%, L2-M317 1%. Other haplogroups accounted for additional 6%.

89.5% of Zabolotnie Tatar males are carrying the Y-DNA haplogroup N-M231, having one of the highest concentration of this haplogroup, second only to the Samoyedic Nganasans.

The closest populations to Zabolotnie Tatars are Khanty, Mansi and the forest Nenets, and just a little bit more distant, but also very close, are the Khakas, Shor and Altai peoples. Because of that geneticists are making conclusion about genetic contribution of Ugric and Samoyedic peoples to the gene pool of Zabolotnie Tatars. It is the high percentage of the haplogroup N1c2b that connects Zabolotnie Tatars to the peoples of the Arctic and South Siberia. It is probably the common heritage of ancient populations of North Eurasia.

== Language ==
The Zabolotnie Tatars speak Zabolotnie, a variant of the Tobol-Irtysh dialect of the Siberian Tatar language. It differs from other forms of Tobol-Irytsh Tatar as it also uses letters f and h, Letter h is also present in Tom Tatar and Baraba Tatar dialects.
