= History of Novosibirsk =

Novosibirsk (until 1926 known as Novo-Nikolayevsk) is the third-most populous city in Russia, after Moscow and Saint Petersburg. Its history is closely tied to the development of the Trans-Siberian Railway and the industrialization of Siberia.

== Foundation and pre-revolutionary period (until 1917) ==
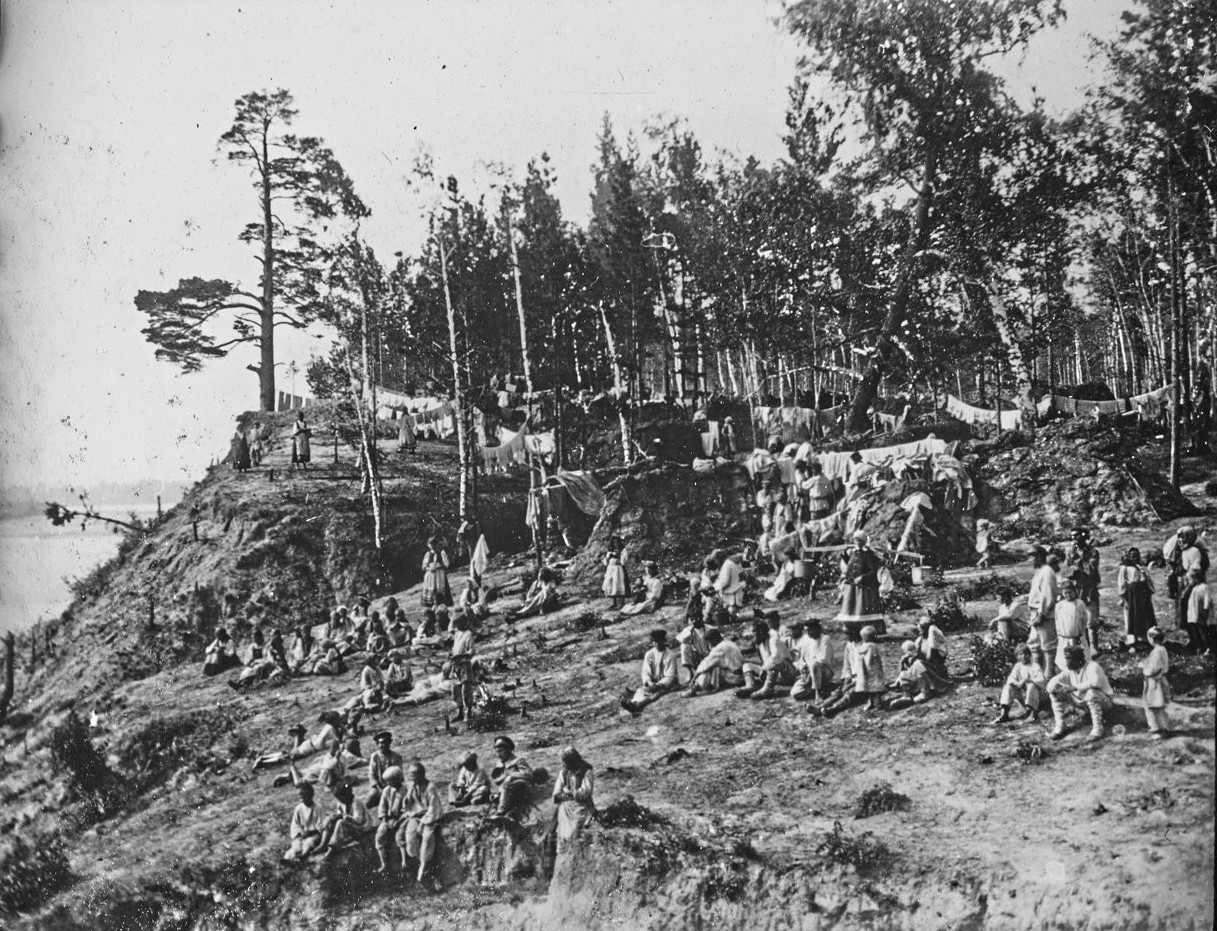
Settlers in Krivoshchyokovo, 1897

The city's history began with the construction of the first railway bridge over the Ob River. The modern boundaries of Novosibirsk include the site of former settlements of the Chat Tatars (16th–18th centuries). The first Russian settlement in the area was the Nikolsky pogost or the village of Bolshoye Krivoshchyokovo, founded in the late 17th century.

On 30 April (12 May) 1893, the first party of workers arrived to build housing for the bridge construction team. During the construction of the railway, some residents were moved to found the Krivoshchyokovo settlement near the station (renamed Novosibirsk-Zapadny in 1960). By 1896, the population grew rapidly from 685 to over 2,000 people. Later, the village was incorporated as the Zaobsky District (renamed Kirovsky in 1934).

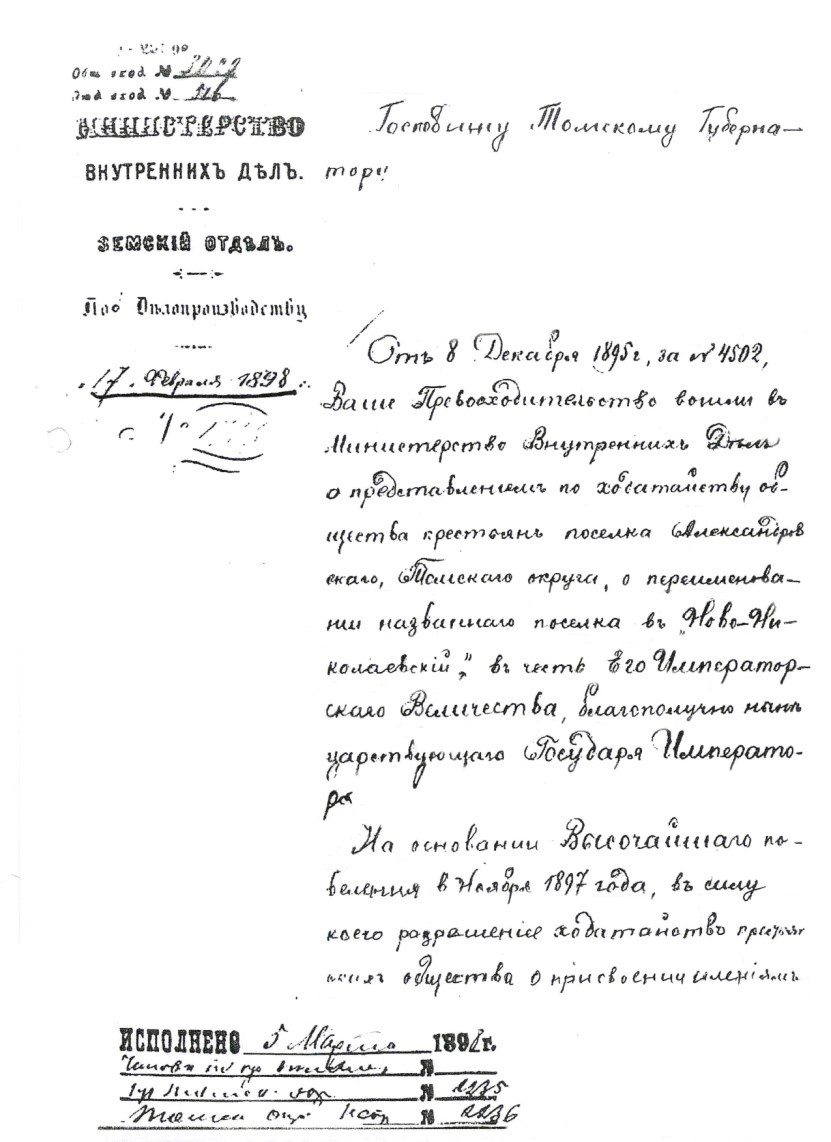
The 1898 official permission to rename the Alexandrovsky settlement to Novo-Nikolayevsk

The city's development was so fast that contemporary officials compared its growth to "American life." The mayor noted that the locals truly loved their land and knew how to care for it. However, on 11 (24) May 1909, a massive fire destroyed 794 houses, followed by an epidemic of typhoid fever and cholera.

By 1915, the population reached 75,000. Industrial growth included many factories (iron foundries, leather, soap, sawmill, etc.). During World War I, the city was sending 25,000 trained soldiers to the front every month. Additionally, there was a camp for Austro-German prisoners of war for 10,000 people, which by January 1917 held approximately 12,000 people.
