= Kazakh rebellions =

18th-21st century events in Kazakhstan

The Kazakh people have rebelled against state power in the forms of civil disobedience and armed resistance. The 18th- and 19th-century Kazakh rebellions are commonly referred to as national liberation uprisings. Between the mid-19th century and 1916, Kazakhstan experienced 300 national liberation movements, wars, and uprisings.

== 18th century ==
=== Pugachev's Rebellion ===
The first joint action by the Kazakh and Russian people against autocracy was the 1773–1775 Pugachev's Rebellion; land was the main reason for Kazakh participation. Nuraly Khan, faced with popular pressure, had unsuccessfully demanded that the Russian government remove grazing restrictions along the Ural River in 1742.

During the second half of the 18th century, the junior-zhuz Kazakhs suffered as a result of Russian colonial policy and the aggressive actions of the Yaik Cossack army. The Russian government, protecting the Cossack troops, banned the nomadic Cossack way of life along one bank of the Ural in 1756.

During the peasant uprising, led by Yemelyan Pugachev, the biy Dautbai urged the Kazakhs to support the rebels. The Kazakh detachments were united along tribal lines, and Syrym Datuly was one of their leaders. Kazakh troops were the main striking force in the capture of a fortress. Nuraly Khan tried to use the rebellion for the return of seized lands. The steppe aristocracy sought to weaken the imperial position in Kazakhstan.

=== Sapura's Rebellion ===
Sapura's Rebellion, led by Sapura Matenkyzy in 1775–1776, was triggered by Russian Empire repression (including imperial prohibitions about land) and the Ural Cossacks. Ten thousand people participated in the uprising.

=== Syrym Datuly's rebellion ===
Junior-zhuz Kazakhs, led by Syrym Datuly, rebelled against the Cossacks from 1783 to 1797. In 1778, during armed clashes with Cossack detachments, Datuly's children were killed.

The driving force behind the rebellion was the Kazakh poor, sharua Kazakhs who saw maintaining Nuraly Khan's power as the cause of their troubles. The deepening agrarian crisis in the second half of the 18th century weakened the khan's position and strengthened opposition to the successors of Abul Khair Khan. Concerned about the insurgents, Nuraly Khan moved to the Ural Cossack line.

Junior-zhuz Kazakh participation in the 1773–1775 rebellion was a consequence of the khan's weakening position. During the uprising, relations between Nuraly Khan and Orenburg governor Iosif Igelström were strained because Igelström supported Datuly. The alliance between Igelström and Datuly centered on the destruction of Nuraly Khan's power in the junior zhuz. Before the struggle, Datuly believed that Kazakh displacement from their tribal nomadic lands could be ended by negotiation.

During the 1783–1797 uprising, Igelström proposed a new system of governance for the junior zhuz. According to Igelström's plan, all power in the junior zhuz would be concentrated in the Frontier Court. Datuly supported Igelström's reforms during the uprising, but the Russian government refused to implement them in the junior juz because of growing anti-monarchist sentiment in Russia. Detachments unable to conduct military operations against rebel guerrilla units attacked peaceful Kazakh villages. To deprive the rebels of support from the auls, the head of the military board ordered the "Kirghiz-Kaisak bandits" pushed to the Emba.

== 19th century ==
=== Bukey Horde uprising ===
In 1801, 5,000 Kazakh households headed by Bukey Khan moved to the Volga–Ural interfluve and began to form the Inner Horde. By the end of the 1830s, its population had grown to about 20,000 households and 80,000 people; land and pastures were distributed unevenly. In a short time, two-thirds of the land was owned by Kazakh feudal lords and Russian landlords.

Jäñgir-Kerei Khan (1825–1845) regarded the horde's territory as the domain of him and his family, and popular discontent triggered a rebellion. It is divided into three periods:

1. 1833–1836 – formation
2. 1837 – development of the uprising: clashes between rebels and Tsarist detachments and supporters of Jäñgir-Kerei Khan
3. 3 December 1837 – July 1838 – weakening and defeat of the rebellion

The rebellion was led by Isatay Taymanuly and Makhambet Otemisuly. In 1812, Bukey Khan appointed Taymanuly leader of the Zhaiyk branch of the Bersh tribe. Taymanuly was tried by the Orenburg governor and acquitted in 1817 and 1823. In 1835, he wrote to the khan asking for protection for the people. Otemisuly, Taymanuly's friend and an elder of the Bersh tribe, played a major role in defining the aims of the uprising in his poetry: weakening the khan's power, improving conditions for the poor, and changing the imperial land policy.

The revolt began with actions against Jäñgir-Kerei Khan and his supporters. A detachment of 200 Cossacks unsuccessfully tried to capture Taymanuly, whose detachment of 1,000 men were joined by other detachments of the Bukey Horde. The rebellion became known in Saint Petersburg, and Nicholas I demanded severe punishment for its leaders.

The last battle between Taymanuly's detachments and imperial troops took place on 12 July 1838 in Akbulak. About 80 insurgents were killed, and Taymanuly was shot and seriously injured. A detachment of insurgents led by Otemisuly continued to fight, but he was forced to retreat to the Khanate of Khiva.

Otemisuly secretly returned to the Bukey Horde in October 1839, and was captured in 1841. In October 1846, he was murdered by followers of Sultan Baimagambet. Although treatment of captured insurgents was harsh, most took refuge among their fellow tribesmen and their prosecution was dropped.

=== Kenesary's Rebellion ===
During the 1820s, part of the senior juz and the southern middle and junior juz were ruled by the Kokand and Khiva beks. In the lower Syr Darya, the Khanate of Khiva built a number of fortresses.

Kenesary's Rebellion, led by Sultan Kenesary Qasymov, lasted from 1837 to 1847 and aimed to preserve the independence of lands that were not part of Russia. Kenesary demanded that Russia restore the independence of the Kazakh Steppe under Abylai Khan, stop collecting taxes and dismantle the fortresses. His representatives, sent to deliver a letter to the West Siberian Governor-General and Tsar Nicholas I, were captured and punished.

The Kazakhs were led by Kenesary and Nauryzbai, his younger brother. In May 1838, Kenesary's detachments captured Akmolinsk. In 1841, Kenesary's troops captured the fortresses of Zhanakorgan, Sozak, and Ak-Mosque and he was elected khan.

Successful military action by Kenesary in 1844 forced the Orenburg administration to begin negotiations to recognize the Orenburg region as part of Russia, and the tsarist government built fortresses along the Irgiz and Turgay Rivers. Kenesary failed to form a coalition against Tsarist Russia, leading to the rebellion's failure, and leaders of the main Zhetysu clans sided with Russia.

=== 1870 Adai uprising ===
Colonial dependence on the Kazakh steppe was strengthened by reforms in 1867 and 1868, in which Kazakh lands were declared the property of the Russian Empire. Kazakhs were taxed for working and living in nearby Russian settlements, and an unsuccessful rebellion began in the Ural and Turgai Oblasts. The Adai tribe rebelled against the reforms in Mangystau region in 1870, and the rebellion involved Kazakh workers for the first time. Despite a small initial success, the rebels were unable to take the Alexander Fort by storm, after which they resisted for some time until they were finally finished off by the Russian expedition.

== 20th century ==
=== 1916 Central Asian revolt ===
In Kyrgyzstan and Kazakhstan, an anti-Russian uprising by the inhabitants of Russian Turkestan was sparked by the conscription of Muslims into the Russian military for service on the Eastern Front during World War I. The corruption of the Russian regime and tsarist colonialism were contributing causes. Nevertheless, the uprising was easily and brutally suppressed by the tsarist government.

=== Revolts against Soviet Russia ===
From 1928 to 1932, 372 uprisings took place in Kazakhstan. The rebellions were generated by the sovietization of villages, taxes in kind, collectivization and dekulakization.

=== Kengir uprising ===
The May and June 1954 Kengir uprising was a rebellion by political prisoners.

=== Jeltoqsan ===
The 16–19 December 1986 Jeltoqsan protests took place in Alma-Ata (present-day Almaty).

== 21st century ==
=== Zhanaozen massacre ===
The Zhanaozen massacre, over the weekend of 16–17 December 2011, occurred amid clashes between protesters and police who were attempting to evict them from a square in preparation for an Independence Day celebration. Activists said that security officers opened fire on unarmed demonstrators. Authorities accused "bandits" of joining the protesters and beginning the riots, producing video to support their version of events. Eleven people were killed, according to government officials, although opposition sources put the death toll in the dozens. General Prosecutor Askhat Daulbayev said that "civilians, who had gathered in the main square to celebrate the 20th anniversary of the country's independence, were attacked by a group of hooligans". The Kazakh opposition TV channel K-Plus broadcast the beginning of the unrest, as men purported to be oil workers ran on a stage, tipped over the speakers and pushed civilians before police arrived. According to Daulbayev, local government offices, a hotel and an office of the state oil company were set on fire in the disturbances which followed.

=== 2022 unrest ===
The 2022 Kazakh unrest was an early-January series of mass protests against energy-price increases and increasing poverty.
