= Movement of Koktemir =

1775 Kazakh rebellion

Movement of Köktemir
- Part of Kazakh rebellions
Date	1775–1776
Location	Territory of the Junior Jüz
Result	Kazakh victory: Fulfilling the demands of the rebels; Successful actions against the Russian Empire

Belligerents
Kazakh Khanate	Russian Empire

Commanders and leaders
(Kazakh Khanate) Sapura Matenqyzy (Kazakh Khanate) Dusaly Sultan (until 1776) (Kazakh Khanate) Seidaly Sultan	(Russian Empire) Catherine II

Strength
10,000	Unknown

Casualties and losses
Unknown	5,000

Movement of Köktemir or Sapura's Rebellion — arose in the autumn of 1775 and was a new form of struggle after the tragic events of spring and summer, when the unrest of the Kazakhs in the Junior Jüz was brutally suppressed by punitive detachments.

== Uprising ==
In September 1775, a man appeared in the Tabyn and Tama clans of the Junior Zhuz, whose name was a legend. The Kazakhs called him "Köktemir", or Invisible. Considering himself Pugachev's successor, Köktemir man campaigned for the continuation of the struggle. His appeals were very popular in the villages of the Junior Zhuz.

Later it turned out that the Köktemir person is 22-year-old Sapura from the Tabyn clan.

In the spring of 1776, the detachments of Seydala Sultan made a series of campaigns against the Bashkirs, who participated in punitive expeditions. Along the border line, it became restless again, the Kazakh detachments began to attack the fortresses, burn fodder and food, and capture prisoners.

Large groups of rebels, numbering 10 thousand people, attacked fortresses, settlements and cities. Attacks were made on the Verkhneuralsk, Tanalytsk, Orsk fortresses, on the Iletsk defense and Orenburg.

Frightened by the new echoes of the Pugachev's rebellion, the government of Catherine II began to bribe the feudal elite of the Junior Zhuz. Thus, back in February 1776, Dusaly Sultan, along with many other feudal lords, withdrew from the uprising. This caused a split in the camp of Köktemir, and fearing new repressions, the rebellious Kazakhs migrated deep into the steppes.

== Results ==
The Kazakh population resisted attempts to consolidate colonial rule, and the uprisings that took place in Kazakhstan between 1773 and 1775 led to the issuance of an imperial decree on August 27, 1782, which can be considered a concession to tsarism. According to this decree, which was handed over for execution to the governor-general Apukhtin, the Kazakhs of the younger zhuz were allowed to drive cattle through Yaik, but subject to an agreement with the owners of the land plots and the payment of a certain fee: due to lack of fodder, their cattle was let into the lands of those regions, then, depending on the possibility and convenience, if they want to hire the land, and they want to give it for rent, then act as in such cases it is customary between subjects by voluntary agreement.

== See also ==
- Pugachev's Rebellion
