= Syrym Datuly =

Leader of the Kazakh clan Bayuly

Syrym Datuly Batyr (Kazakh. سيريم ابن دات Сырым Датұлы; 1753–1802) was the leader of the Kazakh clan Bayuly and national anti-feudal and anti-colonial movements of the Kazakhs of the Little Horde in the years 1783–1797.

In 1774, Syrym Datuly led the Kazakh detachment that assisted Pugachev during his rebellion of 1773–75. In a preserved report dated Jun 22, 1775, Count Alexander Suvorov reports Datuly as one of the active participants in the uprising. However, in the autumn of 1776 Datuly switched sides and assisted the tsarist administration. This allegiance lasted until 1783 when he rejoined the rebels.

In 1783, under Datuly's leadership, a peasant uprising broke out in the Younger Zhuz. The reasons for the insurgency were scarcity of land, the prohibition of the herdsmen to move to the right bank of the Urals by the tsarist authorities, violation of the rights of the clan elders, robbery and violence against the people by Nuraly Khan and the Sultans, the Ural Cossack Army and the tsarist administration. Datuly was captured by the Ural Cossacks and imprisoned until spring 1784, when he was ransomed by Nuraly Khan, who was married to Datuly's sister.

After continues battles, attempts were made to implement reforms into the system of Kazakh clans in the Younger Zhuz which would make it possible for the Tsarist administration to establish order. One of these attempts was made in 1785 during a kurultai, an assembly of the leading chieftains, where it was proposed to divide the Zhuz into three parts or hordes. Syrym Datuly was elected as the first adviser to all three hordes, the entire Younger Zhuz. In this position, he swore allegiance to the Tsarist administration who was keen on implementing reforms drawn up by the governor-general of Siberia and Ufa, Iosif Igelström.

However, there was distrust among the elders when it came to the administration and its reforms, which is why a decision on that matter got postponed on a regular basis. In 1786, Nuraly Khan was expelled from the Younger Zhuz and found refuge with the Tsar administration, which sent him to Ufa. The conflict between the khan as well as the sultans on one side, who refused to tolerate their loss of influence in the steppe and Syrym Datuly on the other side escalated in August 1786 when they captured him and decided to only release him if Nuraly Khan was returned to the Zhuz. He was freed in autumn after intervention from Igelström, who needed his influence within the Kazakh communities to go ahead with the reform. However, while Datuly acknowledged the potential benefits for the Kazakhs in strengthening political and economical relations with the Tsar administration, he did not trust them and set the stage for another uprising by disregarding the reform. He negotiated with the Khanate of Khiva for support in the form of weapons, cavalry and food as well as nomadic land in case of defeat.

In 1789, Igelström presented a new draft of the administration of the Zhuz which was not implemented. The uprising ended in 1797 after many years of raids and battles with the defeat of the insurrection and Syrym Datuly fled to the Khanate of Khiva with fellow tribesmen. He died in 1802.

== See also ==
- History of Kazakhstan
- List of Kazakhs

== Sources ==
- Донесение хана Нурали князю Г. Потемкину о батыре Сырыме Датове и его приближенных 1785 г. ноября 15
- Представление старшин Младшего жуза Срыма Датова и др. в Оренбургскую пограничных дел экспедицию с протестом против избрания султана Ерали ханом. 1792 г. июня 10
- Устные народные сказания об похождениях Сырыма-батыра
- Вяткин Н. П. Батыр Срым. М.-Л. Издательство АН СССР, 1947 (переиздано, Алматы, 1998)
