= Haplogroup Q-M242 =

Human Y chromosome DNA grouping common among Native Americans

Haplogroup Q
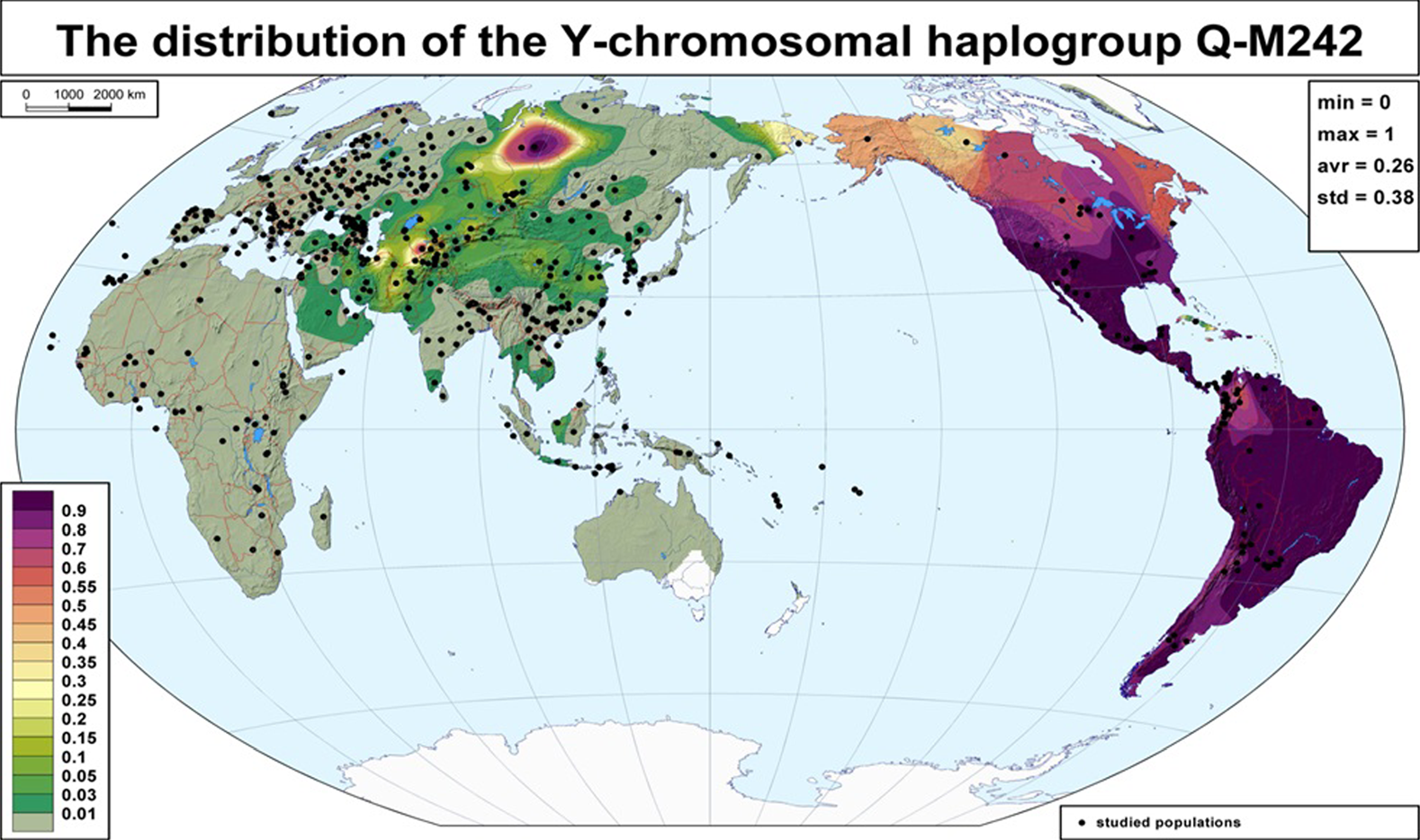
- Frequency distribution of haplogroup Q-M242.
- Possible time of origin: 17,200 to 31,700 years ago (approximately 24,500 years BP)
- Possible place of origin: Beringia, Central Asia, South Central Siberia
- Ancestor: P1-M45
- Descendants: Q-L472/Q-MEH2 (Q1); Q-L275 (Q2)
- Defining mutations: M242 rs8179021
- Highest frequencies: Kets 93.8%, Navajo 92.3%, Indigenous peoples of South America 92%, Inuit 80%, Apache 78.1 %, Turkmens from Karakalpakstan (mainly Yomut) 73%, Selkups 66.4%., Altaians 63.6%., Tuvans (from Xinjiang) 62.5%., Chelkans 60.0%., Greenlandic Inuit 54%, Tozhu Tuvans 52%, Siberian Tatars (Baraba Tatars) ~50%, Tsaatan 43.5 %, Tubalar 41%, Siberian Tatars (Ishtyak-Tokuz Tatars) 38%, Siberian Tatars (Eushta Tatars) 17.6%, Siberian Tatars (Isker-Tobol) 16.7%, Lipka Tatars 10.8%, the indigenous peoples of the Americas, Akha people of northern Thailand, Mon-Khmer people, some tribes of Assam and Swati tribe of Pakistan

Haplogroup Q or Q-M242 is a Y-chromosome DNA haplogroup. It has two primary subclades: Q-L472/Q-MEH2 (Q1) and Q-L275 (Q2). These include numerous subclades that have been sampled and identified in males among modern populations.

Q is the predominant Y-DNA haplogroup among Native Americans, several peoples of Siberia and Central Asia, and the Swati tribe.

== Defining mutations ==
The polymorphism M242, is a C→T transition residing in intron 1 (IVS-866) of the DBY gene and was discovered by Mark Seielstad et al. in 2003. The technical details of M242 are:

Nucleotide change: C to T
Position (base pair): 180
Total size (base pairs): 366
Forward 5′→ 3′: aactcttgataaaccgtgctg
Reverse 5′→ 3′: tccaatP36.2ctcaattcatgcctc

Other defining SNPs unique to Q-M242 include: FGC1752, F2603/M1020, L232/S432, M1115, Y2000/FGC1757, FGC6793, Y1984/FGC1753, Y1987/FGC1754/F6492, FGC7650(H), E337/L808/CTS3727/M1105, M1047(H), M1074, M1154, M1166, Y1972/FGC4603/F7839(H), Y2002/FGC1756/F6477(H), CTS7532/M1133, F3067/M1150/V4116, CTS4717/M997, F1237/M1077/V2083/M1077.1/M1077.2/V2083.1/V2083.2, M1180(H), CTS4717/M997, F826/M1064, F1293/M1080/V2215, F1728/M1092, F1829/M992/V2569/Z801, F2603/M1020, F3067/M1150/V4116, F4052/M1063/V1090, FGC1751, FGC1755 and M1163.

Early definitions of haplogroup Q used a combination of the SNPs M242, MEH2 and P36.2. However, both MEH2 and P36.2 were later found to be synonymous with L472 and, therefore, to define haplogroup Q1.

== Origins ==
Haplogroup Q-M242 is one of two very populous subclades of P1, alongside R-M207.

Y-chromosome haplogroup Q-M242 is believed to have originated in Central Asia and southwestern Siberia, approximately 15,000 to 25,000 years ago.

== Distribution ==
=== Americas ===
Subclades of Q-M346 (Q1b, as of 2019) were the predominant Y-DNA lineages among pre-Columbian indigenous peoples of the Americas. These include, in particular, subclades of Q-M3 (Q1b1a1a) and Q-Z780 (Q1b1a2). Most were descendants of the major founding groups who migrated from Asia into the Americas by crossing the Bering Strait. Subclades of Q1b (M346) other than Q1b1a1a (M3) and Q1b1a2 (Z780) are virtually restricted to the Eurasian continent.

Among Native Americans from North America, two Q-lineages outside Q1b/Q-M346 have also been found. These are Q-P89.1 (under Q1, a.k.a. Q-L472/MEH2) and Q-NWT01 (under Q-F746, a.k.a. Q1a1). These may have not been among the initial migrants from Beringia, but from later arrivals who traveled, using boats, along the shoreline of East Asia and then into North America.

It is unclear whether the current frequency of Q-M242 lineages represents their frequency at the time of immigration or is the result of the shifts in a small founder population over time. Regardless, Q-M242 came to dominate the paternal lineages in the Americas.

==== North America ====
In the indigenous people of North America, Q-M242 is found in Na-Dené speakers at an average rate of 68%. The highest frequency is 92.3% in Navajo, followed by 78.1% in Apache, 87% in SC Apache, and about 80% in North American Eskimo (Inuit, Yupik)–Aleut populations. (Q-M3 occupies 46% among Q in North America)

On the other hand, a 4000-year-old Saqqaq individual belonging to Q1a-MEH2* has been found in Greenland. Surprisingly, he turned out to be genetically more closely related to Far East Siberians such as Koryaks and Chukchi people rather than Native Americans. Today, the frequency of Q runs at 53.7% (122/227: 70 Q-NWT01, 52 Q-M3) in Greenland, showing the highest in east Sermersooq at 82% and the lowest in Qeqqata at 30%.

Q-M242 is estimated to occupy 3.1% of the whole US population in 2010:

Ethnicity	Percentage of USA population †	Haplogroup Q frequency
White	63.7%	Q-P36* 0.6% & Q-M3 0.1%
Latino	16.3%	Q-P36* 3.8% & Q-M3 7.9%
Black	12.6%	Q-P36* (xM3) 0.2%
Asian	4.8%	~0%
Native American ‡	0.9%	Q-P36* 31.2% & Q-M3 26.9%
Source : † According to the US National Population Census data (2010) ‡ Mainland and Alaska, not including the Pacific islands

==== Mesoamerica & South America ====
Haplogroup Q-M242 has been found in approximately 94% of Indigenous peoples of Mesoamerica and South America.

The frequencies of Q among the whole male population of each country reach as follows:

- 61% in Bolivia.
- 51% in Guatemala,
- 40.1% (159/397) to 50% in Peru
- 37.6% in Ecuador,
- 37.3% (181/485) in Mexico (30.8% (203/659) among the predominant Spanish speaking Indigenous segment)
- 31.2% (50/160) in El Salvador,
- 15.3% (37/242) to 21.8% (89/408) in Panama,
- 16.1% in Colombia,
- 15.2% (25/165) in Nicaragua,
- 9.7% (20/206) in Chile,
- 5.3% (13/246 in 8 provinces in northeastern, central, southern regions) to 23.4% (181/775 in 8 provinces in central-west, central, northwest regions) in Argentina,
- 5% in Costa Rica,
- 3.95% in Brazil, and so on.

=== Asia ===
Q-M242 originated in Asia (Altai region), and is widely distributed across it. Q-M242 is found in Russia, Siberia (Kets, Selkups, Siberian Tatars, Siberian Yupik people, Nivkhs, Chukchi people, Yukaghirs, Tuvans, Altai people, Koryaks, etc.), Mongolia, China, Uyghurs, Tibet, Korea, Japan, Indonesia, Vietnam, Thailand, India, Pakistan, Afghanistan, Iran, Iraq, Saudi Arabia, Turkmenistan, Uzbekistan, and so on. (For details, see below.)

==== North Asia ====
In Siberia, the regions between Altai and Lake Baikal, which are famous for many prehistoric cultures and as the most likely birthplace of haplogroup Q, exhibit high frequencies of Q-M242. In a study (Dulik 2012), Q-M242 (mostly Q-M346 including some Q-M3) has been found in 24.3% (46/189: 45 Q-M346, 1 Q-M25) of all Altaian samples. Among them, Chelkans show the highest frequency at 60.0% (15/25: all Q-M346), followed by Tubalars at 41% (11/27: 1 Q-M25, 10 Q-M346) and Altaians-Kizhi at 17% (20/120). In a former study, Q-M242 is found in 4.2% of southern Altaians and 32.0% of northern Altaians with the highest frequency of 63.6% in Kurmach-Baigol (Baygol). The frequency reaches 13.7% (20/146) in the whole samples. In another study, the frequency rises up to 25.8% (23/89: all Q-M346) in Altaians. Based on the results of these studies, the average frequency of Q-M242 in Altaians is about 21%.

Tuva, which is located on the east side of Altai Republic and west of Lake Baikal as well as on the north side of Mongolia, shows higher frequency of Q-M242. It is found in 14%~38.0% (41/108) of Tuvans. Also, Todjins (Tozhu Tuvans) in eastern Tuva show the frequency at ≤22.2% (8/36 P(xR1))~38.5% (10/26, all Q-M346(xM3)). So, the average frequency of Q-M242 among Tuvans-Todjins in Tuva Republic is about 25%. Haplogroup Q-M242 has been found in 5.9% (3/51) of a sample of Tuvans from the village of Kanasi, 9.8% (5/51) of a sample of Tuvans from the village of Hemu, and 62.5% (30/48) of a sample of Tuvans from the village of Baihaba in northern Xinjiang near the international border with Altai Republic.

Baraba Tatars, who represent one out of three major groups of Siberian Tatars, have almost 50% of haplogroup Q-M242, and are represented by two lineages: Q-YP4000 and Q-L330. The Ishtyako-Tokuz sub-group of Tobol-Irtysh group of Siberian Tatars has a frequency of Q-M242 at 38%, while Eushta Tatars have 17.6% of haplogroup Q and Iskero-Tobolsk Tatars 16.7%.

The highest frequencies of Q-M242 in Eurasia are witnessed in Kets (central Siberia) at 93.8% (45/48) and in Selkups (north Siberia) at 66.4% (87/131). Russian ethnographers believe that their ancient places were farther south, in the area of the Altai and Sayan Mountains (Altai-Sayan region). Their populations are currently small in number, being just under 1,500 and 5,000 respectively. In linguistic anthropology, the Ket language is significant as it is currently the only surviving one in the Yeniseian language family which has been linked by some scholars to the Native American Na-Dené languages and, more controversially, the language of the Huns. (See: L. Lieti, E. Pulleybank, E. Vajda, A. Vovin, etc.) Q-M346 is also found at lower rates in Sojots (7.1%, Q-M346), Khakassians (6.3%, Q-M346), Kalmyks (3.4%, Q-M25, Q-M346) and Khanty, and so on.

In far eastern Siberia, Q-M242 is found in 35.3% of Nivkhs (Gilyaks) in the lower Amur River, and 33.3% of Chukchi people and 39.2% of Siberian Yupik people in Chukotka (Chukchi Peninsula). It is found in 30.8% of Yukaghirs who live in the basin of the Kolyma River, which is located northwest of Kamchatka. It is also found in 15% (Q1a* 9%, Q-M3 6%) of Koryaks in Kamchatka.

==== East Asia ====
In some studies, various subgroups of Q-M242 are observed in Mongolia. Q1a2-M346 (mostly Q-L330) occupies 1.4~3.1% of Mongols (1/2~2/3 among Q samples), followed by Q1a1a1-M120 (0.25~1.25%), Q1a1b-M25 (0.25~0.63%), Q1b-M378. In another study, Q is found in 4% of Mongols. Karafet et al. (2018) found Q-L54(xM3) in 2.7% (2/75) and Q-M25 in another 2.7% (2/75) for a total of 5.3% (4/75) haplogroup Q Y-DNA in a sample of Khalkha Mongols from Ulaanbaatar, Mongolia. Based on these studies, the average frequency of Q-M242 in Mongols is estimated to be about 4~5%.

However, most of Q-M242 people in East Asia belong to subclade Q-M120, which distributes most intensively across northern China (the provinces of which the capitals locate northern to Huai River-Qin Mountains line). Q-M242 ranged from 4~8% in northwest China (Xinjiang, Gansu, Shaanxi), north China (Shanxi, Hebei), central China (Henan), and upper east China (Shandong) to 3~4% in northeast China. The average frequency of Q-M242 in northern China is around 4.5%. However, it decreases to about 2% in southern China. In a study published in 2011, researchers have found Q-M242 in 3.3% (12/361) of the samples of unrelated Han-Chinese male volunteers at Fudan University in Shanghai with the origins from all over China, though with the majority coming from east China. In another study published in 2011, Hua Zhong et al. found haplogroup Q-M242 in 3.99% (34/853, including 30/853 Q-M120, 3/853 Q-M346, and 1/853 Q-M25) of a pool of samples of Han Chinese from northern China and 1.71% (15/876, including 14/876 Q-M120 and 1/876 Q-M346) of a pool of samples of Han Chinese from southern China. Q1a1-M120 is unique to East Asians. It is not found in South east Asia except with low diversity in Y-STR among southern Han Chinese indicating it spread during the Neolithic with Han Chinese culture to southern China from northern China. Q1a3*-M346 is only found among Hui and southern Han Chinese in South East Asia in southern China but not found in non-Han indigenous peoples at all. It came from northern China (north east Asia) with the Han. Only Native Americans have Q1a3a-M3, which is a descendant haplogroup of Q1a3*-M346. The Americas was populated by migrants from Central Asia in prehistoric times. Q1a1 is attested in over 3,000 year old Han Chinese ancestral remains in the Shang and Zhou dynasties from the Hengbei archeological site. Modern northern Han Chinese Y haplogroups and mtdna match those of ancient northern Han Chinese ancestors 3,000 years ago from the Hengbei archeological site. 89 ancient samples were taken. Y haplogroups O3a, O3a3, M, O2a, Q1a1, and O* were all found in Hengbei samples.

Q-M242 has been found with notable frequency in some samples of Uyghurs: 15.38% (22/143, including 6/143 Q-M378, 5/143 Q-P36.2*, 4/143 Q-M120, 4/143 Q-M346, 1/143 Q-M25) of a sample of Uyghurs from the Turpan area (吐鲁番地区), 7.9% (6/76, including 2/76 Q1b1-L215/Page82/S325, 1/76 Q1a2-M346*, 1/76 Q1a1a1-M120, 1/76 Q1a2a1c-L330*, 1/76 Q1a2a1c1-L332) of a sample of Dolan Uyghurs (刀郎人) from Horiqol Township of Awat County, and 7.74% (37/478, including 24/478 Q-M346, 7/478 Q-P36.2*, 5/478 Q-M120) of a sample of Uyghurs from the Hotan area (和田地区). However, other studies have found haplogroup Q in much smaller percentages of Uyghur samples: 3.0% (2/67) Q-P36 Uygur, 1.6% (1/64) Q-M120 Lop Uyghur (罗布人). Haplogroup Q was not observed in a sample of 39 Keriyan Uyghurs (克里雅人) from the village of Darya Boyi, located on the Keriya River deep in the Taklamakan Desert.

Haplogroup Q was observed in 3.2% (5/156 : 2 Q-M120, 3 Q-M346) of males in Tibet in one study and in 1.23% (29/2354) of males in Tibet in another study, but this haplogroup was not observed in a sample of males from Tibet (n=105) in a third study.

It is found in about 1.9% of South Koreans, showing the highest frequency in Seoul and Gyeonggi Province at 2.7% and decreasing to the south (Kim 2010). It has been found in about 0.3% of Japanese (with known examples from Shizuoka and Saitama) and in 0.3%~1.2% of Taiwanese.

Subclade Q1b-M378 is also found in China and its neighboring countries at very low frequencies. It exists throughout all Mongolia, with rare examples in Japan.

==== Southeast Asia ====
Haplogroup Q shows low frequencies in Southeast Asia. In a study, the frequencies of haplogroup Q is 5.4% (2/37) in Indonesia, 3.1% (2/64) in the Philippines, 2.5% (1/40) in Thailand. However, other studies show 0% or near 0% frequencies in those countries.

In the case of Vietnam, the frequency is 7.1% in one study of a sample of Vietnamese reported to be from southern Vietnam and 4.3% in a sample of Kinh people from Ho Chi Minh City in southern Vietnam, but 0% or under 1% in other studies in which samples have been collected in Hanoi in northern Vietnam. So, it is hard to define average frequencies. However, Macholdt et al. (2020) have tested a sample of fifty Kinh people from northern Vietnam (all but one of whom are from the Red River Delta region, and 42 of whom are from Hanoi) and found that two of them (4%) belong to Q-M120.

Only some regions and ethnic groups in the continent show high frequencies. Q-M242 is found in 2.8% (3/106, all Q-M346) in Myanmar, and all the Q samples are concentrated in 18.8% in Ayeyarwady (2/11) and 7.1% Bago (1/14) regions in southwest Myanmar. And, Q-M242 is found in 55.6% (15/27) in the Akha tribe in northern Thailand.

==== Central Asia ====
In Central Asia, the southern regions show higher frequencies of Q than the northern ones.

In the northern regions, Q-M242 is found in about 2%~6% (average 4%) of Kazakhs. A study published in 2017 found haplogroup Q Y-DNA in 3.17% (41/1294) of a large pool of samples of Kazakh tribes; however, haplogroup Q was concentrated in the members of the Qangly tribe (27/40 = 67.5%), and it was much less common among the other tribes. The Qangly tribe is related at least in name to the earlier Kankalis and probably also the Kangar union. Haplogroup Q is found in about 2% of Kyrgyz people.

In the southern regions, Q-M242 is found in 5%~6% of Tajiks (Tajikistan). Karafet et al. 2001 found P-DYS257(xQ1b1a1a-M3, R-UTY2), which should be roughly equivalent to haplogroup Q-M242(xM3), in 4/54 = 7.4% of a sample of Uzbeks, apparently sampled in Uzbekistan. Wells et al. 2001 found P-M45(xM120, M124, M3, M173), which should be roughly equivalent to a mix of Q-M242(xM120, M3) and R2-M479(xR2a-M124), in 20/366 = 5.5% of a pool of samples of Uzbeks from seven different regions of Uzbekistan. Di Cristofaro et al. 2013 found Q-M242 in 11/127 = 8.7% of a pool of samples of Uzbeks from three different provinces of Afghanistan, including 5/94 Q-M242(xM120, M25, M346, M378), 4/94 Q-M346, and 1/94 Q-M25 (10/94 = 10.6% Q-M242 total) in a sample of Uzbeks from Jawzjan Province, whose northern border abuts the southeastern corner of Turkmenistan, and 1/28 Q-M242(xM120, M25, M346, M378) in a sample of Uzbeks from Sar-e Pol Province. Wells et al. (2001) found P-M45(xM120, M124, M3, M173) in 10.0% (3/30) of a sample of Turkmens from Turkmenistan, whereas Karafet et al. (2018) found Q-M25 in 50.0% (22/44) of another sample of Turkmens from Turkmenistan, so the frequency of haplogroup Q in that country is not yet clear. However, Grugni et al. (2012) found Q-M242 in 42.6% (29/68) of a sample of Turkmens from Golestan, Iran, and Di Cristofaro et al. (2013) found Q-M25 in 31.1% (23/74) and Q-M346 in 2.7% (2/74) for a total of 33.8% (25/74) Q-M242 in a sample of Turkmens from Jawzjan, Afghanistan, so the frequency of Q-M242 may reach about 40% in Turkmens of Afghanistan and Iran who live in the areas adjacent to Turkmenistan.

Q-M242 accounts for 6.9% of Afghans in a study (Haber 2012). In another study (Cristofaro 2013) with a larger sampling, the frequency of Q rises to 8.9% (45/507). Haplogroup Q occurs at a frequency of 8% (11/136) in Afghan Pashtuns and 3% (5/142) in Afghan Tajiks. In this study(Cristofaro 2013), Turkmens of Jowzjan Province which is neighboring to Turkmenistan show the highest frequency at 33.8% (25/74: 23 Q-M25, 2 Q-M346), followed by Uzbeks at 8.7% (11/144: 6 Q*, 1 Q-M25, 4 Q-M346).

==== Southwest Asia ====
Southwest Asia exhibits high frequencies of Q in northern Iran, and gradually lowering ones to the southwest.

Q-M242 accounts for 5.5% (52/938) in Iran according to Grugni 2012, which shows a large and well allocated sampling. The Q samples (52) in the study consist of various subclades such as Q* (3), Q-M120 (1), Q-M25 (30), Q-M346 (8), Q-M378 (10). The highest frequency is at 42.6% (29/68, all Q-M25) in Turkmens of Golestan, followed by 9.1% in Isfahan (Persian people), 6.8% in Khorasan (Persian people), 6% in Lorestan (Luristan, Lurs), 4.9% in Azarbaijan Gharbi (5.1% of Assyrians and 4.8% of Azeris), 4.5% in Fars (Persian people), and so on. Turkmens are known as the descendants of Oghuz Turks who built many Turkic empires and dynasties. Other studies also show similar frequencies.

In a study (Zahery 2011), the frequency of Q is 1.9% (3/154: all Q-M378) in Iraqis (x Marsh Arabs), and 2.8% (4/143: 1 Q-M25, 3 Q-M378) in Marsh Arabs who are known as the descendants of ancient Sumerians.

Approximately 2.5% (4/157: 3 Q*, 1 Q-M346) of males in Saudi Arabia belong to haplogroup Q. It also accounts for 1.8% (3/164: 2 Q*, 1 Q-M346) in the United Arab Emirates and 0.8% (1/121: Q*) in Oman peoples.

Haplogroup Q-M242 has also been found in 1.1% (1/87, Q-P36) Syrians and 2.0% (18/914, 14 Q*, 4 Q-M25) in Lebanese.

Approximately 2% (10/523: 9 Q*, 1 Q-M25) of males in Turkey belong to haplogroup Q. In a study (Gokcumen 2008), it was found that among Turks who belong to the Afshar tribe (one of Oghuz Turks) haplogroup Q-M242 is seen with a prevalence of 13%.

==== South Asia ====
In Pakistan at the eastern end of the Iranian Plateau, the frequency of haplogroup Q-M242 is about 2.2% (14/638)~3.4% (6/176).

In a study (Sharma2007), Q-M242 is observed in 2.38% (15/630) of Indian people belonging to different regions and social categories. What is interesting is 14/15 samples do not belong to any known subgroups of Q-M242, with 4 among them showing novel (Indian-specific) 'ss4bp' allele under Q-MEH2. This study also reflects the results of some former studies (Sengupta 2006, Seielstad 2003). And, the accumulated result (frequency) of 3 studies is turned out to be 1.3% (21/1615), with 11 out of 21 Q samples. (For more information, see Y-DNA haplogroups in populations of South Asia)

In a regional study in Gujarat (Western India), Q-M242 was found at its highest 12% (3/25) among Nana Chaudharis while the overall percentage in Gujarat was found to be 2.8% (8/284). In another study, 2.6% of Tharus in Chitwan district and 6.1% (3/49) of Hindus in New Delhi, the capital of India were found to be Q-M242 positive.

In a study in which Q-M242 is just classified in P* group, P* (x R1, R2) accounts for 9.7% (23/237: Chakma 13/89, Marma 4/60, Tripura 6/88) in three ethnic groups of Bangladesh. In many cases, all or most of P* (x R1, R2) means Q-M242, and thus most of P* (9.7%) samples in that study can be estimated to be Q-M242.

1.2% of Nepalese people in Kathmandu, the capital of Nepal and 3.2% of people from Tibet are in Q-M242.

3.3% of Sri Lankans are also in Q-M242.

=== Europe ===
Q-M242 is distributed across most European countries at low frequencies, and the frequencies decrease to the west and to the south.

==== Central and Eastern Europe ====
In Central and Eastern Europe, Q-M242 comprises about 1.7% of males. Q-M242 is found in about 2.2% of Hungarians, 2% of Russians, 1.5% of Belarusians, 1.3% of Ukrainians 1.3% of Poles (Poland), 2% of Czechs, 1.5% of Slovaks, 1.2% of Romanians, 0.8% of Moldovans, and 0.5% (4/808: 2 Q-M378, 1 Q-M346, 1 Q-M25) of Bulgarians On the other hand, 3.1% of Székelys from Transylvania (who have claimed to be descendants of Attila's Huns) turned out to be P* (xR1-M173), which virtually means Q-M242. In a related DNA Project of FT-DNA, the frequency of Q-M25 in Székelys (Szeklers) reaches 4.3%.

The Caucasus region shows a frequency at 1.2% in a study, but it may reach over 4% in Azerbaijan, in that 4.9% of the neighboring Iranian Azerbaijanis harbor Q-M242. It is 1.3% in Georgians and Armenians respectively, and Armenian subclades consist of Q-M378 (L245), Q-M346, and Q-M25.

==== Northern Europe ====
In Northern Europe, haplogroup Q comprises about 2.5% of males. According to the Swedish Haplogroup Database, 4.1% (27/664, as of Jan 2016) of Swedish males belong to Q-M242. About 2/3 of the samples analyzed subclades in detail belong to Q1a2b-F1161/L527 and about 1/3 are in Q1a2a-L804. By county, they are distributed intensively in the southern region (Götaland,: not to be confused with Gotland), and rarely to the north. If recalculated by county-population weights, the frequency of Q in Sweden reaches 4.7%.

In Norway, Q-M242 is found in about 2.6% (~4%) of males, with Q-L804 being more common than Q-F1161/L527. It is observed among 1.6% of males in Denmark, 3% in the Faroe Islands (known to be related to Vikings). In an article (Helgason et al.) on the haplotypes of Icelanders, 7.2% (13/181) of males in Iceland are labelled as R1b-Branch A, but they are actually Q-M242. On the other hand, it is 0.2% in Finland, 4.6% in Latvia, 1.1% in Lithuania, 0.5% in Estonia.

==== Western Europe ====
In Western Europe, Q-M242 is observed at very low frequencies, around 0.5% in most of the countries, such as Germany, France, United Kingdom, etc., but some regions show a little higher. It is 2.1% in Switzerland, and it reaches 5.1% in Lyon (Rhône-Alpes) region of France. It is about 4% in Shetland of northernmost Britain, with a place in it showing the highest figure at 8%. Shetland has been known to be a settlement of Vikings. And, surprisingly, Q-M242 in Shetland (also in some areas of Scandinavia, Faroe Islands, Iceland, and the United Kingdom) has turned out to be generically closely linked to the Q-M242 in Central Asia. Also, Shetland (Norse) Q-M242 is revealed to be linked to some Q-M242 of Azeris (Azerbaijan).

==== Southern Europe ====
Southern Europe also shows low frequencies of Q around 0.5%~1%, but some regions exhibits different figures. It is 1.9% in mainland Croatia, but it reaches 14.3% (13/91) in Hvar Islands and 6.1% (8/132) in Korčula. Also, it is about 0.6% in Italy, but it rises to 2.5% (6/236) in Sicily, where it reaches 16.7% (3/18) in Mazara del Vallo region, followed by 7.1% (2/28) in Ragusa, 3.6% in Sciacca, and 3.7% in Belvedere Marittimo.

On the other hand, according to a study (Behar 2004), 5.2% (23/441) of Ashkenazi Jewish males belong to haplogroup Q-P36. This has subsequently been found to be entirely the Q-M378 subclade and may be restricted to Q-L245. Also, 2.3% (4/174)~5.6% (3/53) of Sephardi Jews are in haplogroup Q.

=== Africa ===
Haplogroup Q is rarely found across North Africa. It is observed in 0.7% (1/147), of Egyptians and in 0.6% (1/156) of Algerian people. Surprisingly, it is also witnessed in 0.8% (3/381, all Q-M346) of males from Comoros which is located in between East Africa and Madagascar.

To combine the data above, Q-M242 is estimated to be in about 3.1% of males of the world.

== Subclade structure ==
In Y chromosome phylogenetics, subclades are the branches of a haplogroup. These subclades are also defined by single-nucleotide polymorphisms (SNPs) or unique-event polymorphisms (UEPs). Haplogroup Q-M242, according to the most recent available phylogenetics has between 15 and 21 subclades. The scientific understanding of these subclades has changed rapidly. Many key SNPs and corresponding subclades were unknown to researchers at the time of publication are excluded from even recent research. This makes understanding the meaning of individual migration paths challenging.

=== Phylogenetic trees ===
There are several confirmed and proposed phylogenetic trees available for haplogroup Q-M242. The scientifically accepted one is the Y Chromosome Consortium (YCC) one published in Karafet 2008 and subsequently updated. A draft tree that shows emerging science is provided by Thomas Krahn at the Genomic Research Center in Houston, Texas. The International Society of Genetic Genealogy (ISOGG) also provides an amateur tree.

==== The 2015 ISOGG tree ====
The subclades of Haplogroup Q-M242 with their defining mutation (s), according to the 2015 ISOGG tree are provided below. The first three levels of subclades are shown. Additional detail is provided on the linked branch article pages.

- Q-M242 M242
  - Q-P36.2 P36.2, L232, L273, L274 (Q1)
    - Q-MEH2 MEH2 (Q1a)
      - Q-F1096 F1096, F1215 (Q1a1)
        - Q-NWT01 NWT01 (Q1a1a)
          - Q-M120 M120, M265/N14 (Q1a1a1)
        - Q-M25 M25, M143 (Q1a1b)
          - Q-L712 L712 (Q1a1b1)
      - Q-M346 L56, L57, M346, L528 (Q1a2)
        - Q-L53 L53 (Q1a2a)
          - Q-L54 L54 (Q1a2a1)
            - Q-CTS11969 CTS11969, M930 (Q1a2a1a)
              - Q-M3 M3 (Q1a2a1a1)
                - Q-M19 M19 (Q1a2a1a1a)
              - Q-L804 L804 (Q1a2a1a2)
            - Q-CTS1780 CTS1780, M981, M971, Z780 (Q1a2a1b)
            - Q-L330 L330 (Q1a2a1c)
        - Q-F835 F835, L940 (Q1a2b)
        - Q-F1161 F1161
          - Q-L527 L527
    - Q-L275 L275, L314 (Q2)
      - Q-M378 M378/Page100, L214, L215/Page82 (Q2a)
        - Q-FGC1774 FGC1774, Y2016 (Q1b1a)
          - Q-245 L245 (Q1b1a1)
      - Q-Y1150 Y1150 (Q1b2) (Q1b-L68)

==== The Genomic Research Center draft tree ====
Below is a 2012 tree by Thomas Krahn of the Genomic Research Center. The first three levels of subclades are shown. Additional detail is provided on the linked branch article pages.

- P-M45
  - Q-M242 M242
    - P36.2, L232, L273.1, L274.1
      - MEH2, L472, L528
        - M120, N14/M265
        - M25, M143, L714, L716
        - M346, L56, L57, L474, L892, L942
        - P89.1
        - NWT01
      - L275, L314, L606, L612
        - M378, L214, L215

==== The Y Chromosome Consortium tree ====
This is the 2008 tree produced by the Y Chromosome Consortium (YCC). Subsequent updates have been quarterly and biannual. The current version is a revision of the 2010 update. The first three levels of subclades are shown. Additional detail is provided on the linked branch article pages.

- P-M45
  - Q-M242 M242
    - Q-P36.2 P36.2
      - Q-MEH2 MEH2
          - Q-M120 M120, N14, M265
          - Q-M25 M25, M143
        - Q-M346 L56, L57, M346
          - Q-P89.1 P89.1
      - Q-L275 L275
        - Q-M378 L214, L215, M378

=== Phylogenetic variants ===
The subclade (under Q-MEH2) proposed by Sharma (2007), which shows polymorphism (ss4bp, rs41352448) at 72,314 position of human arylsulfatase D pseudogene, is not represented in any current trees under Q-MEH2. The most plausible explanation for this could be an ancestral migration of individuals bearing Q-MEH2 to the Indian subcontinent followed by an autochthonous differentiation to Q-ss4bp.

=== Subclade distribution ===
- Q (M242)
  - Q* – Found with low frequency in India and Pakistan. Important in Afghanistan, paragroup Q-M242 (xMEH2, xM378) was found in eight Pashtun males (3 Kabul, 4 Laghman, 1 Kapisa). Also found in one Rapanui male of Easter Island.
  - Q-P36.2 (P36.2) Found with low frequency in Iran.
    - Q-MEH2 (MEH2) Was found in Koryaks (at 10.3%), although the level of STR diversity associated with Q-MEH2 is very low, this lineage appears to be closest to the extinct Paleo-Eskimo individuals belonging to the Saqqaq culture arisen in the New World Arctic about 5.5 Ka.
      - Q-M120 (M120, M265/N14) – It has been found at low frequency among Han Chinese, Dungans, Nivkhs, Koryaks, Yukaghirs, Vietnamese, Japanese, Tuvans, Kalmyks, Koreans, Mongols in Mongolia, Tibetans, and Hmong Daw in Laos. It also has been reported in samples of Bhutanese, Hazara, Bruneian Murut, Gujar, Baloch, Georgian, and Peruvian populations.
      - Q-M25 (M25, M143) – Found with high frequency of 30-45% in Turkmens and Turkmenistan Confused with R1b1 because of P25. Found with high frequency in Turkmens of Golestan province (Iran), Jawzjan ( Afghanistan), and with low to moderate frequency in Lebanon, Mongolia, and Turkey
      - Q-M346 (L56, L57, M346) – Found at low frequency in Europe, South Asia and West Asia. It has been found in Pakistan, Iran, Afghanistan, Kyrgyzstan, Saudi Arabia, the United Arab Emirates, India, Mongolia, Tibet, and Bali.
        - Q-L53 (L53, L54, L55, L213)
          - Q-M3 (M3) – Common in indigenous peoples of the Americas
            - Q-M19 (M19) – Found among some indigenous peoples of South America, such as the Ticuna and the Wayuu
            - Q-M194 (M194) – In South America
            - Q-M199 (M199, P106, P292) – In South America
        - Q-M323 (M323) – It has been detected in Yemenite Jews.
    - Q-L275 (L275, L314)
      - Q-M378 (M378) – It is widely distributed in Europe, South Asia, West and East Asia. It is found among samples of Hazaras and Sindhis. It is also found in the Mongols, the Japanese people and the Uyghurs of North-Western China in two separate groups. The Q-M378 subclade is a branch to which Q-M242 men in some European Jewish Diaspora populations belong. Its subbranch Q-L245's subclades Q-Y2200 and Q-YP1035 are found in Ashkenazi Jews. Some Sephardic Jews carry other subclades of Q-L245, including Q-BZ3900, Q-YP745, and Q-YP1237. Q-M378 samples also have been located in Central America (Panama) and South America (Andean Region)

== Y-DNA Q samples from ancient sites ==
- South Central Siberia (near Altai)
  - Afontova-Gora-2, Yenisei River Bank, Krasnoyarsk (South Central Siberia of Russia), 17000YBP: Q1a1-F1215 (mtDNA R)
  - Afanasievo culture, Yenisei River Bank, 4160YBP-4075YBP: 2 Q1a2 (mtDNA U5a1d2b and U5b2a1a+163)
- Eastern Europe
  - Zvejnieki burial ground, northern shore of Lake Burtnieks in northern Latvia, 6600YBP-6470YBP: Q1a2 (mtDNA U5b2a1a)
- North America
  - Anzick-1, Clovis culture, western Montana, 12600YBP: Q1a2-L54* (not M3, mtDNA D4h3a)
  - Kennewick Man, Washington, 8500YBP: Q1a2-M3 (mtDNA X2a)
- Altai (West Mongolia)
  - Tsagaan Asga and Takhilgat Uzuur-5 Kurgan sites, westernmost Mongolian Altai, 2900YBP-4800YBP: 4 R1a1a1b2-Z93 (B.C. 10C, B.C. 14C, 2 period unknown), 3 Q1a2a1-L54 (period unknown), 1 Q-M242 (B.C. 28C), 1 C-M130 (B.C. 10C)
- Greenland
  - Saqqaq (Qilakitsoq), Greenland, 4000YBP: Q1a-YP1500 (mtDNA D2a1)
- China
  - Hengbei site (Peng kingdom cemetery of Western Zhou period), Jiang County, Shanxi, 2800-3000YBP: 9 Q1a1-M120, 2 O2a-M95, 1 N, 4 O3a2-P201, 2 O3, 4 O*
    - In another paper, the social status of those human remains of ancient Peng state (倗国) are analyzed. aristocrats: 3 Q1a1 (prostrate 2, supine 1), 2 O3a (supine 2), 1 N (prostrate) / commoners : 8 Q1a1 (prostrate 4, supine 4), 3 O3a (prostrate 1, supine 2), 3 O* (supine 3) / slaves: 3 O3a, 2 O2a, 1 O*
    - (cf) Pengbo (倗伯), count of Peng state is estimated as Q-M120.
  - Pengyang County, Ningxia, 2500YBP: all 4 Q1a1-M120 (with a lot of animal bones and bronze swords and other weapons, etc.)
  - Heigouliang, Xinjiang, 2200YBP: 6 Q1a* (not Q1a1-M120, not Q1a1b-M25, not Q1a2-M3), 4 Q1b-M378, 2 Q* (not Q1a, not Q1b: unable to determine subclades):
    - In a paper (Lihongjie 2012), the author analyzed the Y-DNAs of the ancient male samples from the 2nd or 1st century BCE cemetery at Heigouliang in Xinjiang – which is also believed to be the site of a summer palace for Xiongnu kings – which is east of the Barkol basin and near the city of Hami. The Y-DNA of 12 men excavated from the site belonged to Q-MEH2 (Q1a) or Q-M378 (Q1b). The Q-M378 men among them were regarded as hosts of the tombs; half of the Q-MEH2 men appeared to be hosts and the other half as sacrificial victims.
  - Xiongnu site in Barkol, Xinjiang, all 3 Q-M3
    - In L. L. Kang et al. (2013), three samples from a Xiongnu) site in Barkol, Xinjiang were found to be Q-M3 (Q1a2a1a1). And, as Q-M3 is mostly found in Yeniseians and Native Americans, the authors suggest that the Xiongnu had connections to speakers of the Yeniseian languages. These discoveries from the above papers (Li 2012, Kang et al., 2013) have some positive implications on the not as yet clearly verified theory that the Xiongnu were precursors of the Huns.
  - Mongolian noble burials in the Yuan dynasty, Shuzhuanglou Site, northernmost Hebei China, 700YBP: all 3 Q (not analysed subclade, the principal occupant Gaodangwang Korguz (高唐王=趙王 阔里吉思)'s mtDNA=D4m2, two others mtDNA=A)
    - (cf) Korguz was a son of a princess of Kublai Khan (元 世祖), and was the king of the Ongud tribe. He died in 1298 and was reburied in Shuzhuanglou in 1311 by his son. (Do not confuse this man with the Uyghur governor, Korguz who died in 1242.) The Ongud tribe (汪古部) was a descendant of the Shatuo tribe (沙陀族) which was a tribe of Göktürks (Western Turkic Khaganate) and was prominent in the Five Dynasties and Ten Kingdoms period of China, building three dynasties. His two queens were all princesses of the Yuan dynasty (Kublai Khan's granddaughters). It was very important for the Yuan dynasty to maintain a marriage alliance with Ongud tribe which had been a principal assistant since Genghis Khan's period. About 16 princesses of the Yuan dynasty married kings of the Ongud tribe.

== See also ==
=== Populations ===
- Paleo-Indians
- Indigenous peoples of the Americas
- Ket people
- Selkup people
- Siberian Tatars
- Inuit
- Chukchi people
- Akha people
- Turkmens
- Paragroup

=== Y-DNA Q-M242 subclades ===
- Q-M242
- Q-NWT01
- Q-M120
- Q-B143
- Q-M25
- Q-M346
- Q-L53
- Q-L54
- Q-M3
- Q-M323
- Q-P89.1
- Q-Z780
- Q-L275
