= Kalmak Tatars =

Subgroup of Tom Tatars

ҡалмаҡтар, qalmaqtar

Regions with significant populations
- Russia: 500

Languages
- Tom dialect of Siberian Tatar, Russian

Religion
- Sunni Islam

Related ethnic groups
- Other Siberian Tatars, Oirats, Altai people (especially Teleuts)

The Kalmak Tatars (Siberian Tatar: ҡалмаҡтар, qalmaqtar) are one of the three subgroups of Tom group of Siberian Tatars. Their traditional areas of settlement are northwestern parts of Kemerovo Oblast, close to the town of Yurga.

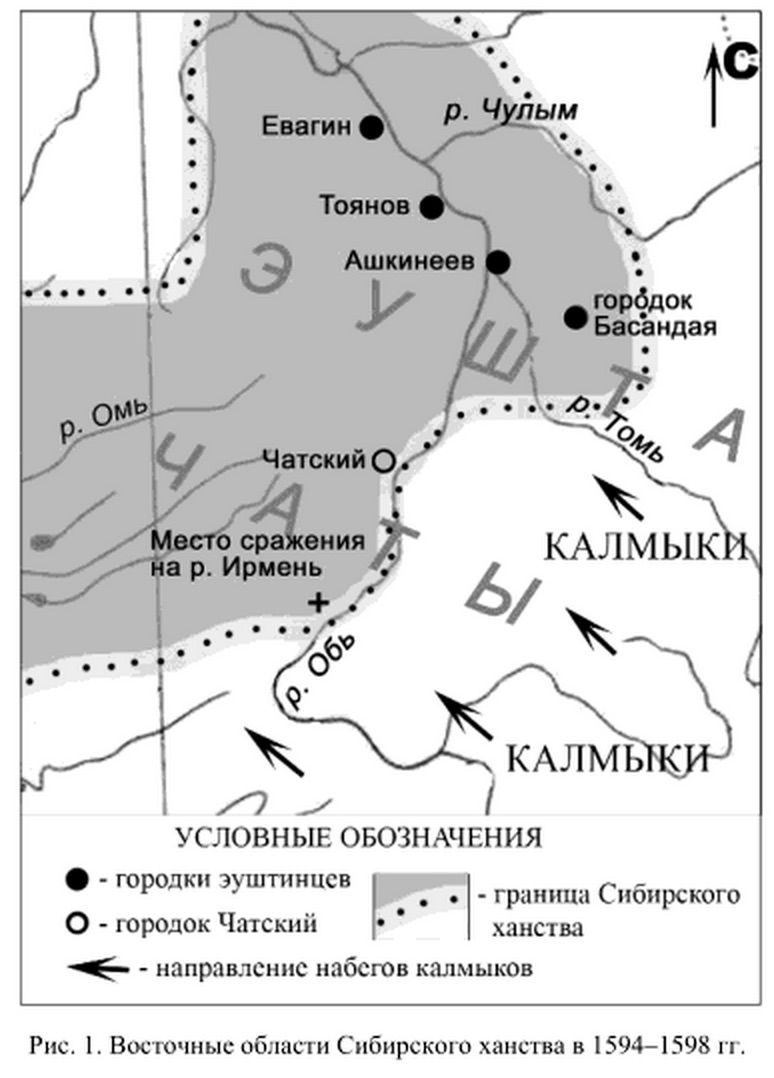
Eastern region of the Khanate of Sibir in 1594-1598

The origins of the Kalmak Tatars trace back to the 17th century, when a group of Teleuts from the central parts of Kemerovo Oblast migrated to the north. Kalmak Tatars adopted Islam in the 18th century due to influence of Siberian Bukharans and Volga-Ural Tatars. These factors created an endogamous barrier between Kalmak Tatars and Russians, which helped Kalmak Tatars to preserve their identity.

In the 19th and 20th centuries, Kalmak Tatars inhabited mainly Zimnik, Bolshoy Ulus close to the town of Yurga, in the Yurginsky district, and Yurty-Konstantinovy (Тумаел, Tumael) in the Yashkinsky district, close to Tomsk oblast.

Kalmak Tatars speak Kalmak variant of the Tom dialect of the Siberian Tatar language.

== Culture ==
The Kalmak Tatars are considered to be mostly assimilated but retain their Teleut roots. They speak a local dialect of the Siberian Tatar language. However some sources consider the language of the Kalmak Tatars to be a separate variety of Tatar, or even a dialect of the Teleut language, as it somewhat differs from other Siberian Tatar varieties.

The Kalmak Tatars are Sunni Muslims. They converted to Islam around the late 18th century under the influence of Volga Tatars and Siberian Bukharans.

== Genetics ==
The majority of Kalmak Tatars belong to Y-DNA haplogroup N1c1-Y16311 which originates from N1c1-F4205, like Mongols and Kalmyks. This differentiates them from Teleuts, whom some scholars believe the Kalmak Tatars descend from.
