= Uprising in the Ural and Turgai Oblasts =

- Part of Kazakh rebellions
Date	1868–1869
Location	Ural Oblast and Turgai Oblast
Result	Uprising suppressed

Belligerents
Kazakh rebels	Russian Empire

Commanders and leaders
Bergen Kospanov; Seil Turkebaev; Kuspai Aibasov; Mambetali; Kanaly Aryslanuli	(Russian Empire) Vladimir Verevkin

Strength
3,000	(Russian Empire) 28 hundred Cossacks (2,800) (Russian Empire) 4 companies of infantry with 6 guns

Casualties and losses
500 captured	Unknown

Uprising in the Ural and Turgai Oblasts — anti-colonial uprising on the territory of modern Kazakhstan. The uprising was led by large Kazakh ancestors.

== Uprising ==
The reason for the uprising was the dissatisfaction of the local population with the "temporary regulation" on the management of the Steppe regions, which suggested an increase in taxation, the restriction of the rights of the Muslim clergy and local nobility (Sultans) and fundamental changes in the socio-spiritual sphere of society.

In October 1868, the Kazakhs of the Ural region refused to submit to the tsarist administration, pay taxes, and did not allow commissions to carry out reforms into the villages. The rebel detachments concentrated in the area of Lake Chelkar, the Taipak, Ulenti, Shiderty and Ankaty tracts. From December 1868 to October 1869, attacks on the line, burning of farmsteads and stealing livestock from rich Kazakhs continued.

On March 27, 1869, the Orenburg Governor-General was informed that local tribes had elected their leaders - Bergen Kospanov, Seil Turkebaev, Kuspay Aibasov, Mambetali and Kanali Aryslanuly - to lead independent power in the regions. The Christianization of the region encouraged the Kazakhs to join the uprising. During the uprising on the territory of modern Kazakhstan in the last quarter of the 19th century, "national-religious" and "Western" directions of development of Kazakh society were formed.

The rebellion covered a significant area from the Emba River to the north and south. In particular, Russian merchants and local feudal lords were attacked. Between March and June, 41 raids were carried out on the estates of Biys, Sultans and local elders. Trade of the Orenburg province with Bukhara, Turkistan and the Steppe was also interrupted.

To suppress the uprising, hundreds of Cossacks with artillery from the Kalmykov fortress and Uralsk were sent to the Steppe with the ataman and the military governor of the region, General Verevkin. By order of the Minister of War, at the end of June, a punitive expedition consisting of 28 hundred Cossacks, 4 companies of infantry with 6 guns set out into the steppe. The entire Orenburg line was put on alert. At the confluence of the Steppe river Kargaly into Ilek, the construction of a new fortification of Aktobe began. The rebel Kazakh villages concentrated in the area of the Emba, Khobda, Uil and Kiil Rivers, expecting help from the Khiva Khan, but it never came. In July in 1869, a decisive clash took place in the Zhaman-say tract on the Uil River, the rebels were defeated. More than 500 participants in the uprising were sentenced to death or hard labor, and a huge indemnity was imposed on the Kazakhs to compensate for losses to the Cossacks and settlers.

== See also ==
- Adai rebellion
