= Siberian Tatars =

Turkic ethnic group indigenous to Siberia

Себерләр
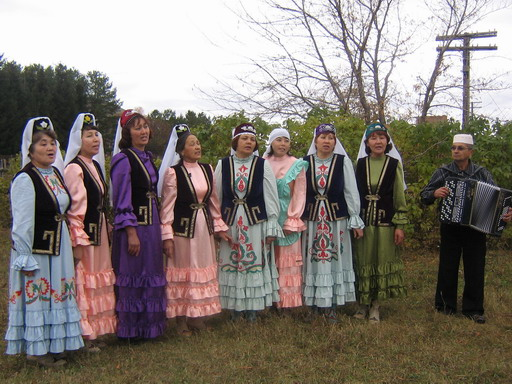
- Siberian folklore group Naza from Omsk Oblast

Regions with significant populations
- Russia: 6,297 (2020 census) – 210,000: Tyumen Oblast: 5,711; Khanty-Mansi Autonomous Okrug: 182; Yamalo-Nenets Autonomous Okrug: 98; Omsk Oblast: 138; Novosibirsk Oblast: 24; Tomsk Oblast: 12; Sverdlovsk Oblast: 12; Kemerovo Oblast: 6
- Turkey

Languages
- Siberian Tatar (L1); Tatar; Russian

Religion
- Sunni Islam

Related ethnic groups
- Telengits, Tubalars, Teleuts, Altaians, Chelkans, Kyrgyz, Chulyms, Khakas, Shors, Kumandins, Oirats, Tuvans, Buryats, Kazakhs, Nenets, Selkup, Kets, Khanty, Mansi

Siberian Tatars (Siberian Tatar: Себерләр), or simply Siberians , are the indigenous Turkic-speaking population of the forests and steppes of southern Western Siberia, originating in areas stretching from somewhat east of the Ural Mountains to the Yenisey River in Russia. The Siberian Tatars call themselves Yerle Qalıq ("older inhabitants"), to distinguish themselves from more recent Volga Tatar immigrants to the region.

The word "Tatar" or "Tadar" is also a self-designation by some closely related Siberian ethnic groups, namely the Altaians, Chulyms, Khakas, and Shors.

The 2010 census counted more than 500,000 people in Siberia defining their ethnicity as "Tatar". About 200,000 of them are considered indigenous Siberian Tatars. However, only 6,779 of them called themselves "Siberian Tatars". It is not completely clear which part of those who called themselves "Siberian Tatars" consider themselves to be a separate ethnos and which part as a group into the Tatar people, because the census took into account the Siberian Tatars as a subgroup of the Tatar ethnos.

Flag of Siberian people

As of 2018, the Siberian Tatars do not yet have public education available in their own language. Lessons in the local schools are taught only in the Russian and Volga Tatar languages.

== Population ==
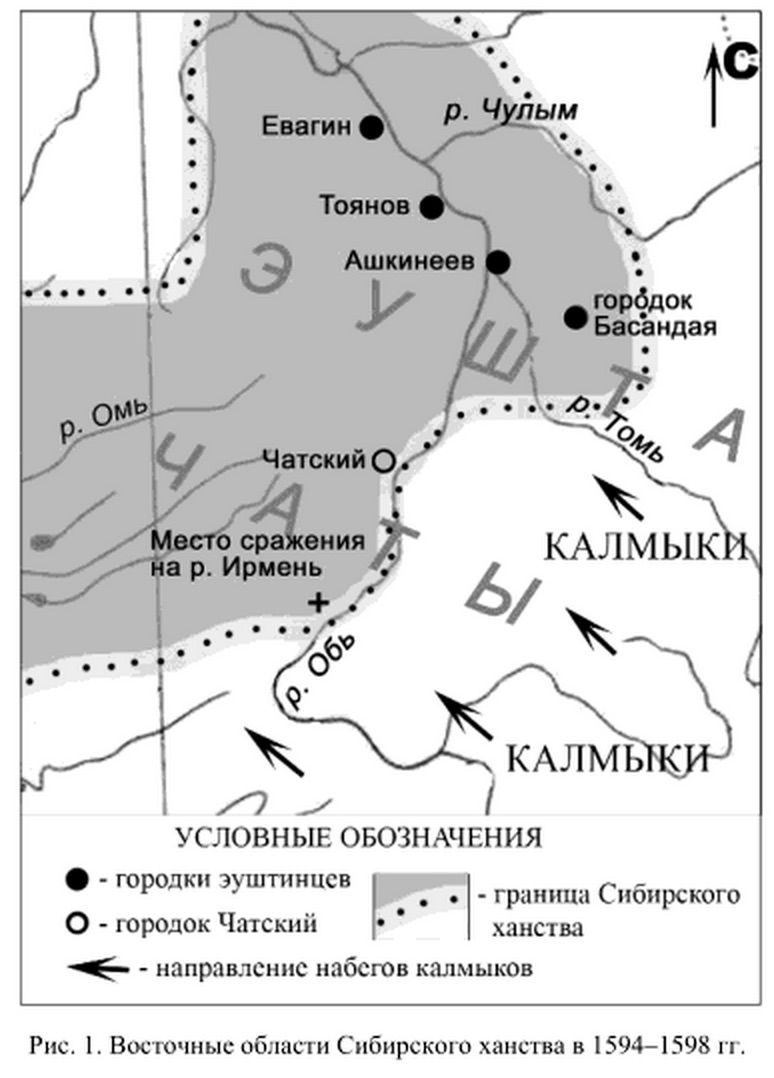
Eastern region of the Khanate of Sibir in 1594–1598

Siberian Tatars historically lived in the vast territory stretching from around the Yenisey River all the way to the area lying somewhat east of the Ural Mountains.

According to the ambassadors of the Siberian Khanate ruler Yediger Khan, who visited Moscow in 1555, the population of "the black people", not counting the aristocracy, was 30,700. In a decree concerning tribute issued by Ivan the Terrible, the population was given as 40,000.

According to the results of the 1897 All-Russia Census, there were 56,957 Siberian Tatars in the Tobolsk Governorate. This was the last accurate information about this population. In later censuses, Tatar immigrants from the other regions of Russia were also recorded under the classification of Tatar. The Siberian Tatars tried to avoid the census as much as possible, as they believed that it was an attempt to force them to pay the Yasak (tribute).

The Siberian Khanate (Khanate of Sibir)

Their population in the territory of the current Tyumen Oblast in 1926 was recorded as 70,000; in 1959 as 72,306; in 1970 as 102,859; 136,749 in 1979; 227,423 in 1989; and 242,325 in 2002. According to the results of the 2002 Russian Census, there were 385,949 Tatars living in the oblasts discussed above. (Their territory roughly corresponds to the historical territory of the Siberian Khanate). Of these Tatars only 9,289 identified as Siberian Tatars.

2002 Russian Census recorded a total of 9,611 Siberian Tatars in Russia. Some publications estimated their number in the range of 190,000-210,000. Such significant discrepancy is explained by the fact that the immigrants from the other ethnic groups who are also called Tatar by the Russians were also included in the figure, though most were Volga Tatars.

== Physical anthropology ==
Among Siberian Tatars there are various phenotypes: Uraloid (Mongoloid with Caucasoid elements), Mongoloid, and Caucasoid (influence of Volga-Ural Tatars and Siberian Bukharans).

Like most of the modern indigenous human groups of West Siberia, Siberian Tatars reveal traits that are specific of West-Sibirid anthropological type. Siberian Tatars show a combination of features characteristic of both eastern and western Eurasians.

West Sibirid is divided into Uralic (Ugric and Sub-Ugric subtypes) and Ob-Irtysh (Tobol-Barabinsk and Tom-Narym subtypes) types. To Ugric type belong Ob-Ugric peoples, while to the Ob-Irtysh type belong Selkups and Turkic peoples of the West Siberian plain (Siberian Tatars, Khakas, Altaians).

Among the modern populations, those closest to the Ust-Ishim people are the Tobol-Irtysh Tatars, especially Tyumen Tatars and Kurdak-Sargat Tatars, implying genetic continuity with the medieval groups.

The Ob-Irtysh Mongoloid anthropological type of the West Siberian race, which include Khanty, Mansi and other indigenous peoples of Russian Asia may have roots in Southeast Asia.

== Origin and ethnogenesis ==
The term Siberian Tatar covers three autochthonous groups, all Sunni Muslims of the Hanafi madhhab, found in southern Siberia. They are remnants of the Khanate of Sibir, which was conquered by Russia in 1582.

Geographically, the Siberian Tatars are divided into three main groups, each speaking their own dialect. Although the Siberian Tatar language has been sometimes considered a dialect of Tatar, detailed linguistic study demonstrates that Siberian Tatar idioms are quite remote from Volga Tatar by origin. Siberian Tatars' ancestry can be traced back to Turkic, Mongolic, Ket, Samoyedic and Ugric tribes.

According to N. F. Katanov, who studied the legends of Siberian Tatars, the army of Kuchum Khan was divided into four wings: Kordak, Turaly, Ayaly, and Baraba.

== Siberian Tatar language ==
The Siberian Tatar language is, due to the Kipchakization processes during the Middle Ages, many times classified as belonging to the Kipchak-Kirgiz and Kipchak–Nogay group of the Kipchak languages. There are approximately as many elements that could be classified in the Upper Altaian language group. Generally, Tobol-Irtysh Tatar dialect is classified as belonging to Kipchak–Nogai group, while Baraba Tatar dialect and Tom Tatar dialect are classified as belonging to Kipchak–Kyrgyz group of Kipchak languages.

Beginning in the 12th century, the Siberian Tatar language received some Karluk influences. Those Siberian Tatars who are living in ethnically mixed villages where, in the periods after Russian colonization, more numerous Volga Tatars settled, have also been influenced by the Kipchak-Bulgar language.

Siberian Tatar language has different dialects. Since the penetration of Islam until the 1920s after the Russian Revolution, Siberian Tatars, like all Muslim nations, were using an alphabet that had been based on Arabic script. They adopted an alphabet based on Latin script in 1928 and one based on the Cyrillic script in 1939. Until 2014, the written language for Siberian Tatars was Tatar, a version based on the grammar rules of Volga Tatars.

In the 21st century, work began on the rationalizing of the Siberian Tatar language. Teams have conducted scientific research in the field of literary language norms of the indigenous population of Siberia. They have published the "Русско-сибирскотатарский словарь = Урысца-сыбырца сүслек" (2010) (Russian-Siberian Tatar Dictionary), and "Грамматика современного сибирскотатарского языка" (2014)(The Grammar of Modern Siberian Tatar Language).

International Organization for Standardization ISO 639-3 PA with its headquarters in Washington, awarded in 2013, the Siberian Tatar language classification code 'sty' in New Language Code Element in ISO 639-3. The first person who seriously researched Siberian Tatar language was Gabdulkhay Akhatov, a Soviet Volga Tatar linguist and an organizer of science.

== Culture ==
Traditional occupations of the Siberian Tatars included hunting, raising horses, and porterage (the latter being important because of the major trade routes situated within the region). Starting in the 19th century, some Siberian Tatars sought work in tanneries and sawmills. Modern Siberian Tatars work in various and diverse occupations.

Some traditional foods in Siberian Tatar cuisine include barley, kattama, boortsog, noodles, and peremech along with several dairy items like kaymak and qurut.

The Siberian Tatars profess Sunni Islam. Before converting to Islam, the Siberian Tatars practiced shamanism. Shamanistic influences can still be found in certain funerary and spiritual customs. Islamization of the region first occurred around the 14th century. The adoption of Islam among the Siberian Tatars began by the early 15th century and most were Muslim by the late 18th century. Contact with Siberian Bukharans and later Volga Tatars helped facilitate the acceptance of Islam among the Siberian Tatars.

=== Attire ===
In terms of cut and color, the ancient outerwear of the Siberian Tatars is similar to the Central Asian and Sayan-Altai (with a Uyghur-Chinese lapel), women's dresses are similar to the Bashkir (with several rows of frills along the hem), and costumes from the early 20th century and later are subject to Volga-Ural Tatar influence.

== Groups ==
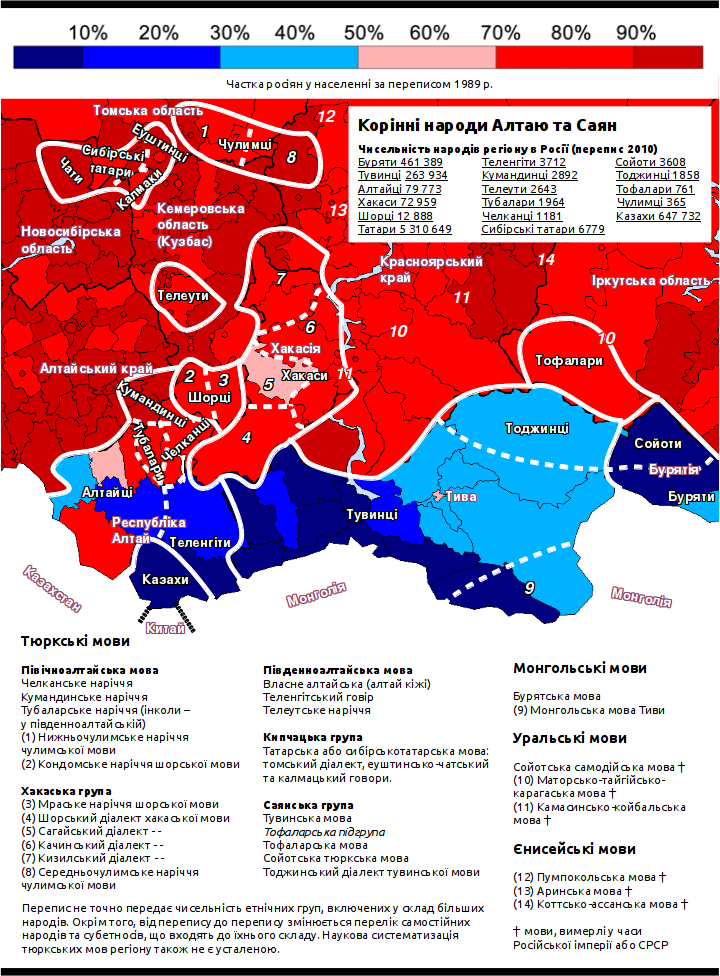
Tom Tatars, the easternmost group of Siberian Tatars

=== Tobol-Irtysh Tatars ===
The Tobol-Irtysh Tatars group is the most numerous out of all 3 groups of Siberian Tatars. In 1897 they numbered 37,600. They live in the Omsk, Tyumen and Sverdlovsk oblasts.

The sub-groups are: Zabolotnie (Yaskolbinsk), Tyumen-Tura, Tobol, Kurdak-Sargat, Tara.

=== Baraba Tatars ===
Their self-designation is Baraba Tatar, and they are found mainly in the Baraba Steppe, in the Novosibirsk oblast and neighboring regions of Omsk oblast. Their population is around 8,000.

The sub-groups are: Baraba-Turazh, Lyubey-Tunus, Terenin-Choy.

=== Tom Tatars ===
The Tom Tatars are indigenous population of Tomsk, Kemerovo and Novosibirsk oblasts. Their population is around 3,000, although some estimates put the number as high as 20,000.

The sub-groups are: Eushta, Chat, Kalmak.

== Genetics ==
The most common Y-DNA haplogroup among Baraba Tatars is the haplogroup Q (around 50%), specifically the Q-YP4000 and Q-L330 subclades. Among northern Baraba Tatars, the most widespread is haplogroup N1b-P43, specifically the N-VL67 subclade. Other less common haplogroups are R1a1-Z93 and R1b-M73.

Among Tom Tatars there has not yet been found any connection between gene pools of Tom Tatars and Samoyedic peoples. There is a clear genetic connection only with Northern Altaians, Bachat Teleuts and Kazakhs. R1a-Z93, which is widespread among Tom Tatars, has probably Altai or Sayan origin. Kalmak Tatars overwhelmingly belong to N1c1-Y16311 which originates from N1c1-F4205. This haplogroup is not present among Bachat Teleut and Southern Altaians, who, according to historians and ethnographs, also are descendants of late middle age Teleuts (White Kalmucks). The closest to Tom Tatars are Mongolians and Kalmyks. It is possible that Kalmak Tatars are the descendants of the so-called Black Kalmucks, together with some groups of Tyumen Tatars and Yalutor Tatars (Tobol-Irtysh Tatars).

The gene pool of Tom Tatars (Eushta Tatars and Chat Tatars) living in three settlements was studied: the village of Chernaya Rechka, the village of Takhtamyshevo, and the village of Eushta. According to different haplogroups, the connection of Tom Tatars with Teleuts, Northern Altaians, Shors, Khakas, Tuvans and Buryats is shown, which confirms their connection with the South Siberian Turkic-speaking and Mongolian-speaking peoples. It was revealed that tested Tom Tatars belong to 14 Y-DNA haplogroups. Only 2 from 14 haplogroups were present in all three settlements: C2a1a2a and R1a1a1b2a2b.

The Takhtamyshevo settlement: The most common is the haplogroup R1b1a1a2a2c1-CTS1843 (32%), which is widespread in the Volga and southern Urals region among Bashkirs, Kazan Tatars, Udmurts and Chuvash. Probable origin of this haplogroup among Tom Tatars are Kazan Tatar and Bashkir immigrants to the region. This is confirmed also from the anthropological perspective, as inhabitants of the Takhtamyshevo village show more Caucasoid physical features compared to the rest of Tom Tatars. Second most common is the haplogroup C2a1a2a-M86, which is also present in the two other researched settlements of village Eushta and Chernaya rechka. This samples are very close to Kazakhs of middle and lesser juzes. The presence of this haplogroup is the legacy of Mongolic component among Tom Tatars, and it is also a historical fact. One man was found to belong to rare haplogroup N1a1a1a1a4a2-A9408, which is connected with Ugric tribes. In this case it is not clear if this haplogroup has its origins with immigrant from the Urals or its a legacy of older local inhabitants.

The Chernaya Rechka settlement: The inhabitants of this village belong to the most varied Y-DNA haplogroups. The most common haplogroup among the villagers is the N1a1a1a3a2-Z35326 (26,7%). Its presence among the Tom Tatars is connected with Mongolic genetic component of Tom Tatars, which is in line with historical facts. These samples are very close to the samples of Tuvans and Buryats. Second most common is the haplogroup R1a1a1b2a2b-Z2122 (20%). This haplogroup is also represented in the other two villages of Takhtamyshevo (16%) and Eushta (20,6%), and is the marker of Turkic component in the gene pools of Tom Tatars. Its origin is connected with the territory of Southern Siberia, although nowadays it is not the most common haplogroup in the region. Two males from the villages of Chernaya Rechka and two males from the village of Eushta bear the haplogroup N1a2b3-B525,VL81. This line is very close to the Kazakhs. Apart from its presence among Siberian Tatars, its presence was not observed among other indigenous Siberian populations. Rare samples belong to haplogroups I1, I2a, J2a, J2b, which are connected with European and Central Asian immigrants to the region.

The Eushta settlement: The Tom Tatars of Eushta village are, compared to the ones from the villages of Takhtamyshevo and Chernaya Rechka, the most homogenous. In this village, the most common haplogroup is Asiatic haplogroup R1b1a1a1b-Y20768xY20784 (35,3%). At the approximately the same level this haplogroup is also present among Teleuts (31%). Some Khakas and Shor samples also belong to that genetic line. Judging by YSTR haplotypes, these populations are very closely related. The presence of this haplogroup in the village of Eushta is probably the consequence of resettled Kalmak Tatars from the Kemerovo oblast. The second most common haplogroup is Q1b1b-YP4004 (17,6%), which is legacy of local Turkic peoples. Close to this line is its sister haplogroup of Q1b1b-BZ2199. It is very common among Chelkans and Tubalars. Some Khakas samples also belong to that genetic line. Third most common haplogroup among males of the Eushta village is South Siberian haplogroup R1a1a1b2-CTS9754 (14,7%). This haplogroup is very close to the Khakas, Shor and Tuvan samples. The haplogroups of males of Eushta village show no evidence of mixing with Kazan Tatars and other immigrants from the European territory. The closeness of genetic lines with Teleuts, Northern Altaians, Shors, Khakas and Tuvans tells us about the common legacy of the Turkic-speaking peoples of the Altai-Sayan region.

89.5% of Zabolotnie Tatar males are carrying the Y-DNA haplogroup N-M231, having one of the highest concentration of this haplogroup, second only to the Samoyedic Nganasans.

== Siberian Bukharans ==
The Bukharlyks, literally "those from the city of Bukhara" are descendants of 15th- and 16th-century fur merchant colonies from Western Caucasus. These settlers have now merged entirely with Siberian Tatars.

== Social organization ==
During the period of the Siberian Khanate and earlier, the Siberian Tatars had tribal relations with elements of the territorial community. In the 18th - early 20th centuries, the Siberian Tatars had 2 forms of community: the volost community and the village community. The functions of the volost community were mainly fiscal and represented an ethnic and class community. The village community was a land unit with its inherent regulation of land use, economic functions, and management functions. Management was carried out by democratic gatherings. The manifestation of the communal tradition is the custom of mutual assistance.

The role of the tugum was of no small importance for the Siberian Tatars. A tugum is a group of related families originating from one ancestor. The role of the tugum was to regulate family, household and domestic relations, and to perform religious and folk rituals. The role of the religious community, which regulated certain relations in the community as a whole, was also important.

== Famous Siberian Tatars ==
- Minsalim Timergazeev – sculptor
- Anvar Kaliev – World War II USSR hero
- Iskander Dautov – World War II USSR hero
- Khamit Neatbakov (Neotbakov) – World War II USSR hero
- Khabibulla Yakin – holder of the Order of glory
- Tamerlan Ishmukhamedov – World War II USSR hero
- Raushan Abdullin – hero of the Russian Federation
- Nafigulla Ashirov – mufti, president of The Spiritual Muslim Board of the Asiatic Part of Russia
- Aleksandr Bashirov – film and theater actor, director and screenwriter (Siberian Tatar mother)
- Galima Shugurova – rhythmic gymnast
- Abdurreshid Ibrahim – imam, pan-Islamist, journalist, traveler

== Diaspora ==
Siberian Tatar communities are found in Kazakhstan and Central Asia. Some Siberian Tatars from Omsk oblast emigrated to the Ottoman Empire (nowadays Cihanbeyli, Turkey), where in 1908 they founded the village of Böğrüdelik.

== See also ==
- Khanate of Sibir
