= Tom Tatar dialect =

Siberian Tatar dialect spoken in Tomsk, Kemerovo and Novosibirsk Oblasts in Russia

Tom Tatar
- Native to: Russia
- Region: Kemerovo, Tomsk and Novosibirsk Oblasts
- Ethnicity: Tom Tatars
- Language family: Turkic: Common Turkic; Kipchak; Kipchak–Kyrgyz; Siberian Tatar; Tom Tatar
- Dialects: Eushta-Chat; Or Chat; Kalmak

Language codes
- ISO 639-3: –
- Glottolog: tomm1241 Tomsk Tatar kalm1245 Kalmak Tatar

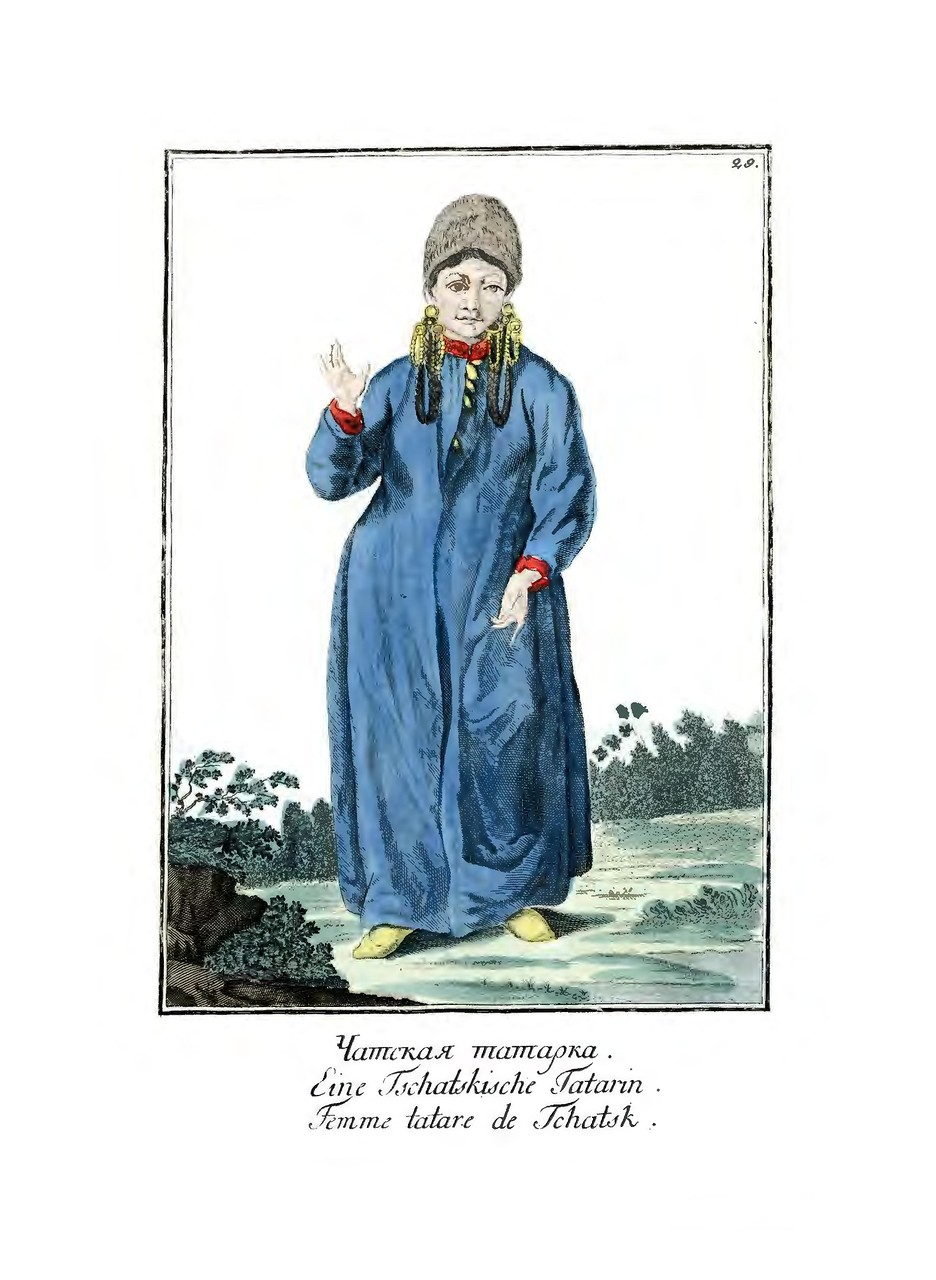
Chat Tatar woman. Illustration from a book published in 1799.

The Tom Tatar dialect is one of three major dialects of Siberian Tatars. Eushta, Kalmak and Chat Tatars speak this dialect.

== Classification ==
In Tumasheva's opinion, the Tom dialect is grammatically very close to Altai and related languages.

== Dialects ==
According to Tumasheva, Tom dialect is divided into three sub-dialects:

- Eushta-Chat dialect (Tomsk Oblast)
  - Or sub-dialect of Chat Tatars (Novosibirsk Oblast)
- Kalmak dialect (Kemerovo Oblast). (Sometimes considered a distinct language or dialect of Teleut)

== See also ==
- Siberian Tatars
- Siberian Tatar language
- Khanate of Sibir
