= Adai, Khyber Pakhtunkhwa =

Adai
- Location within Pakistan
- Coordinates: 34.97°N 71.56°E
- Country: Pakistan
- Territory: Federally Administered Tribal Areas
- Elevation: 1,376 m (4,514 ft)
- Time zone: UTC+5 (PST)
  - Summer (DST): UTC+6 (PDT)

Adai is a town in the Federally Administered Tribal Areas of Pakistan. It is located at 34°57'54N 71°33'53E with an altitude of 1376 metres (4517 feet).
