= Nelkan =

Nelkan (Russian: Нелькан) is the name of several inhabited localities in Russia.

Urban localities

- Nelkan, Sakha Republic, a settlement in Oymyakonsky District of the Sakha Republic

Rural localities

- Nelkan, Khabarovsk Krai, a selo in Ayano-Maysky District of Khabarovsk Krai
