= Teleuts =

Altay: тэлэңэт, тэлэңут, Тадар, Пайат Telenget, Telengut, Tadar, Payat

Regions with significant populations
- Russia: Kemerovo Oblast: 2,643

Languages
- Teleut

Religion
- Predominantly Russian Orthodox; Minority Sunni Islam, shamanism

Related ethnic groups
- Other Altaians, Siberian Tatars, Shors, Tofalar

Teleuts (Altay: тэлэңэт, тэлэңут, тадар, romanized: Telenget, Telengut, Tadar) are a Turkic Indigenous people of Siberia living in Kemerovo Oblast, Russia. According to the 2010 census, there were 2,643 Teleuts in Russia. They speak the Teleut language/dialect of Southern Altai language.

In the Soviet years and until 2000, the authorities considered the Teleuts to be part of the Altai people. Currently, according to the Resolution of the Government of the Russian Federation No. 255 dated March 24, 2000, as well as 2002 and 2010 Russian Census, they are recognized as a separate ethnic group within Indigenous small-numbered peoples of the North, Siberia and the Far East.

== History ==
The Teleuts were once part of the Tiele people. They came under the rule of the First Turkic Khaganate. Near the end of the 16th century, the Teleuts wandered the steppe between the Irtysh and the Ob' rivers. They became nominal subjects to the Oirats at this period. Their population at this time numbered 4,000 tents.

The Russians gained control of the region in the mid-eighteenth century and the Teleuts subsequently became their subjects. The Russians called the Teleuts "White Kalmyks" in their documents despite the ethnic and linguistic differences between the Kalmyks and Teleuts.

The Teleuts consider themselves to be a distinct people and many do not accept being labeled as Altaian. The majority of the Teleuts live along the Great and Little Bachat Rivers in Kemerovo Oblast. However, a few Teleuts also live in the Altai Republic.

== Culture ==
Most Teleuts used to be nomadic or semi-nomadic livestock herders and horses, goats, cattle, and sheep were the most common types of animals they raised. Some Teleuts were hunters and relied on animals living in the taiga for subsistence.

Traditional Teleut dwellings included conic yurts made out of bark or perches. Traditional Teleut dress was composed of linen shirts, short breeches, and single-breasted robes.

== Religion ==
Most Teleuts are Orthodox Christians. However, there is a minority that practice shamanism. Burkhanism was once widely practiced by the Teleuts but was effectively eliminated during the Soviet era. Contemporary revivals of the religion among other Altaian groups have not affected the Teleuts. A group of Teleuts known as Kalmaks are Muslims. Around the 17th century, these Teleuts moved up to the north of Kemerovo Oblast and interacted with local Siberian Tatars and became Sunni Muslims. Today they number around 500 and have mostly assimilated into Tatar culture while retaining their Teleut roots. They speak a local dialect of the Siberian Tatar language heavily influenced by the Teleut language.

== See also ==
- Altay language
- Altayans
- Kalmak Tatars
- Turkic peoples
