= Chat Tatars =

Subgroup of Tom Tatars

цаттыр, чаттыр, cattyr, chattyr
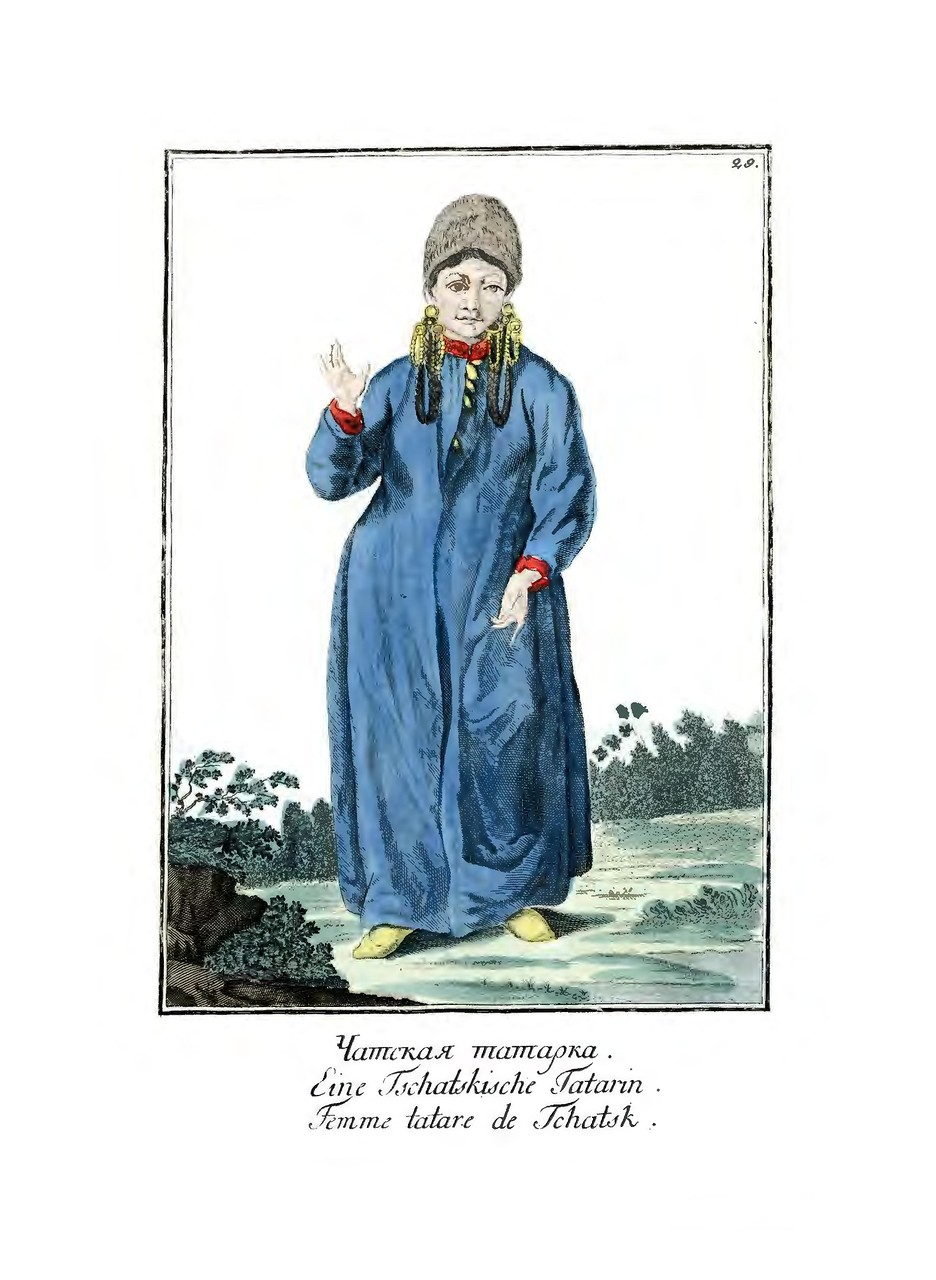
- Chat Tatar woman. Illustration from a book published in 1799.

Regions with significant populations
- Russia: 2100: Tomsk Oblast; Novosibirsk Oblast

Languages
- Tom dialect of Siberian Tatar, Russian

Religion
- Sunni Islam

Related ethnic groups
- other Siberian Tatars

The Chat Tatars or Chats (Siberian Tatar: цат татарлар, цаттыр, чат татарлар, чаттыр, cat tatarlar, cattyr, chat tatarlar, chattyr, Russian: чаты) are one of the three subgroups of Tom group of Siberian Tatars. Their traditional areas of settlement are on the rivers Ob, Chik, Uen', and Chaus in Kozhevnikovsky District, Tomsk Oblast, and in Kolyvansky and Moshkovsky districts, Novosibirsk Oblast since the 8th century, later also on the territory of modern Shegarsky, Tomsky, Kochenyovsky, Bolotninsky, Novosibirsky, Toguchinsky, Iskitimsky, Ordynsky districts, and in the cities of Tomsk, Novosibirsk, and Berdsk. They live, among others, in the villages of Chernaya Rechka and Takhtamyshevo.

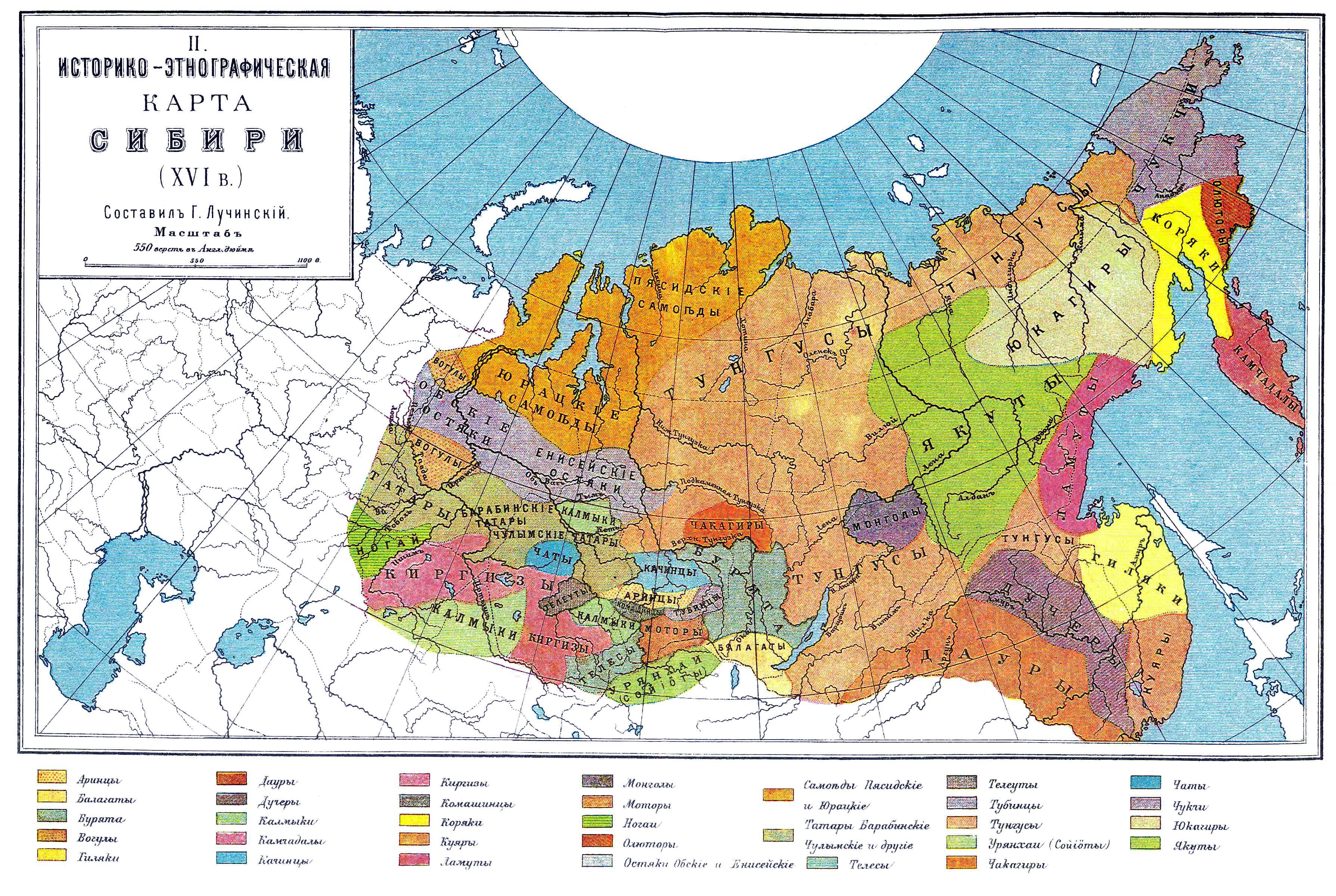
Peoples of Siberia in the 16th century.

Chat Tatars are divided into two sub-groups: Tom Tatars (Tomsk Oblast) and Ob Tatars (Novosibirsk Oblast). To a significant degree they have been assimilated by Russians (Ob Tatars) and by other Siberian Tatars, usually depending on the religion (Christianity vs. Islam).

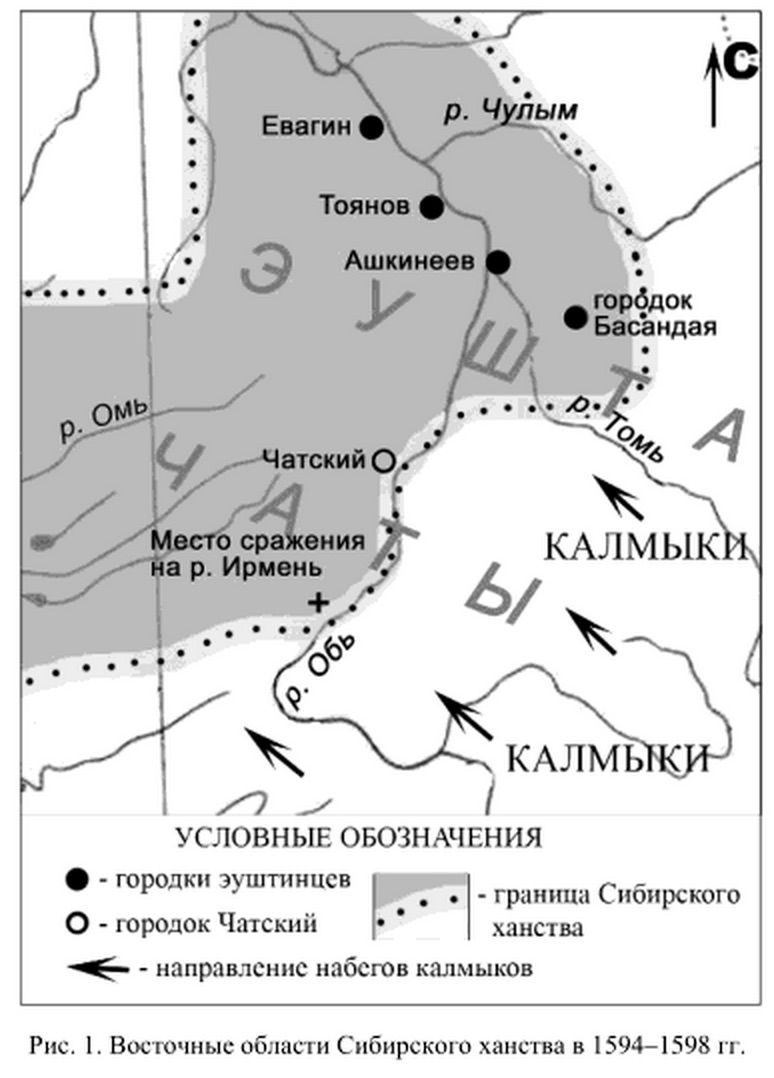
Eastern region of the Khanate of Sibir in 1594-1598

Chat Tatars (along with other related groups of Siberian Tatars) are Sunni Muslims.

Chat Tatars, native to Tomsky district of Tomsk oblast speak Eushta-Chat variant of the Tom dialect, while those native to Novosibirsk oblast and close regions of Tomsk Oblast speak Or Chat subdialect.

== Genetics ==
According to Valikhova L.V. et al. (2022), in the Chat Tatar villages of Chernaya Rechka and Takhtamyshevo predominate Eastern Eurasian Y-DNA haplogroups N1a1a1a3a2-Z35326, C2a1a2a-M86, and R1a1a1b2a2b-Z2122, as well as R1b1a1a2a2c1-CTS1843 (in the Takhtamyshevo village), which is otherwise widespread in the Volga-Ural region. Chat Tatars harbor strong Mongolic component, but also a Siberian Turkic one.
