= Bayuly =

Bayuly (rich son) is one of three tribal confederation of Little jüz which generally occupies western Kazakhstan.

== Clans ==
Bayuly as a tribal confederation consists of 13 clans, including:

- Adai
- Alasha
- Alt'n
- Baibakty
- Bersh
- Esentemir
- Issyk
- Kzylkurt
- Maskar
- Sherkesh
- Tana
- Tazlar
- Zhappas

== History ==
Population of Bai-Uly in 1897 was 600,000 people, around 16.2% of all Kazakhs at the time.
