= Goans =

People native to Goa, India

Goenkar, Goeses
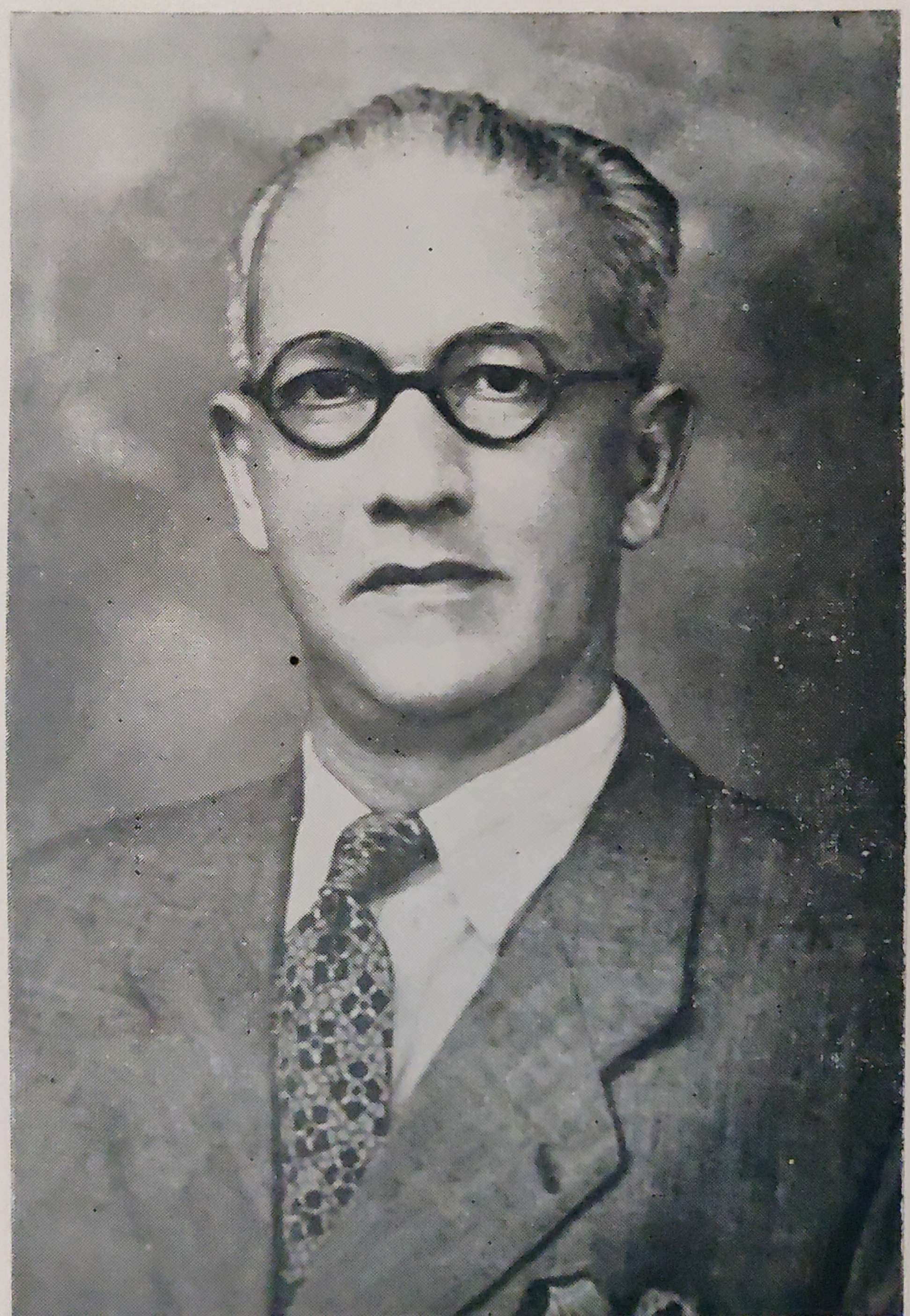

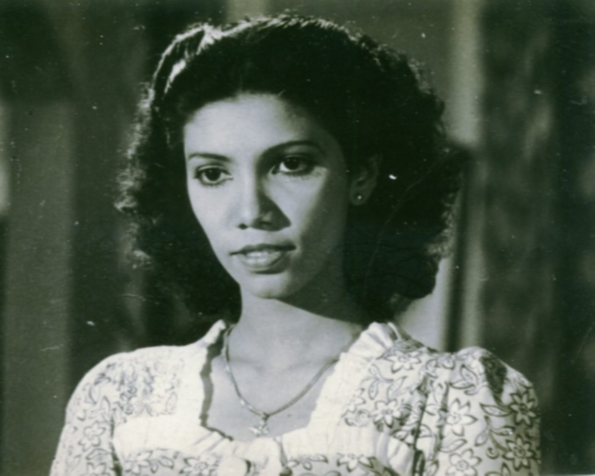

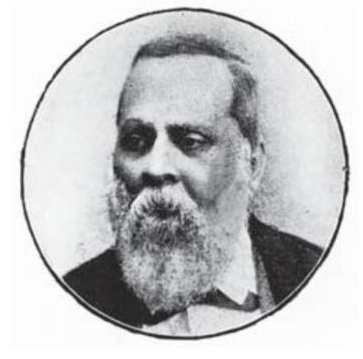

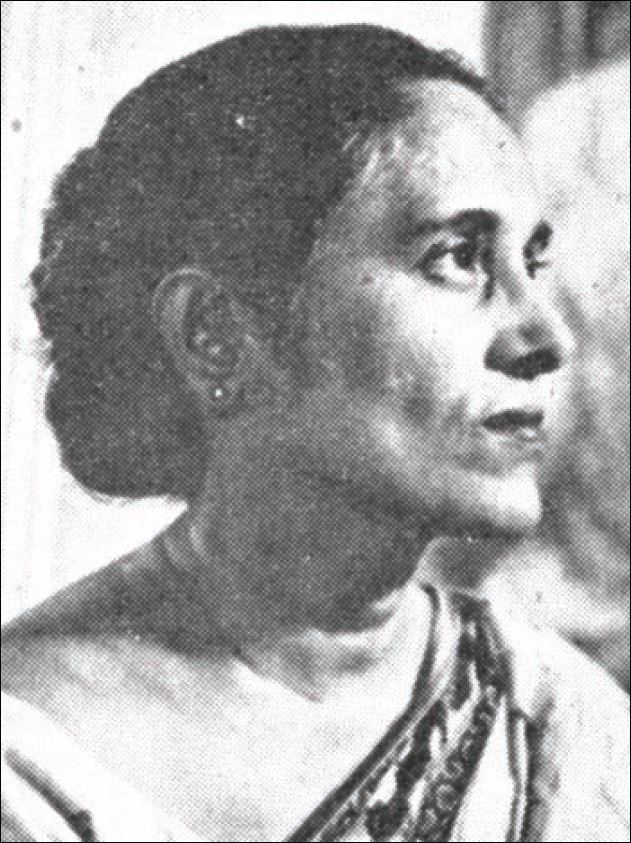

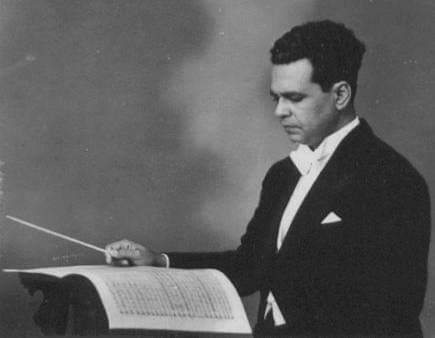

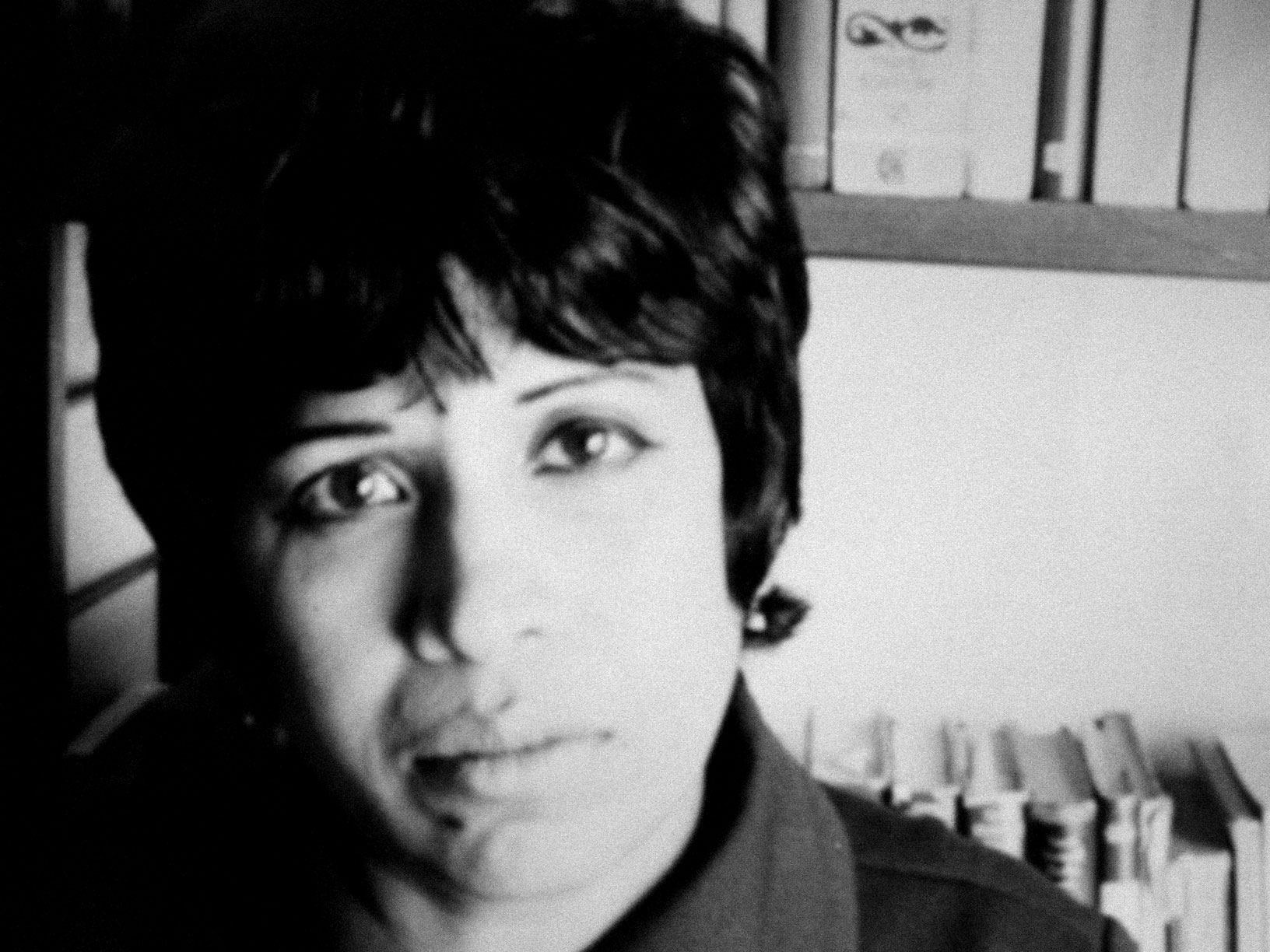

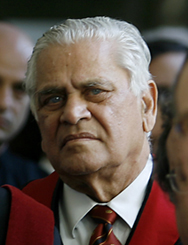

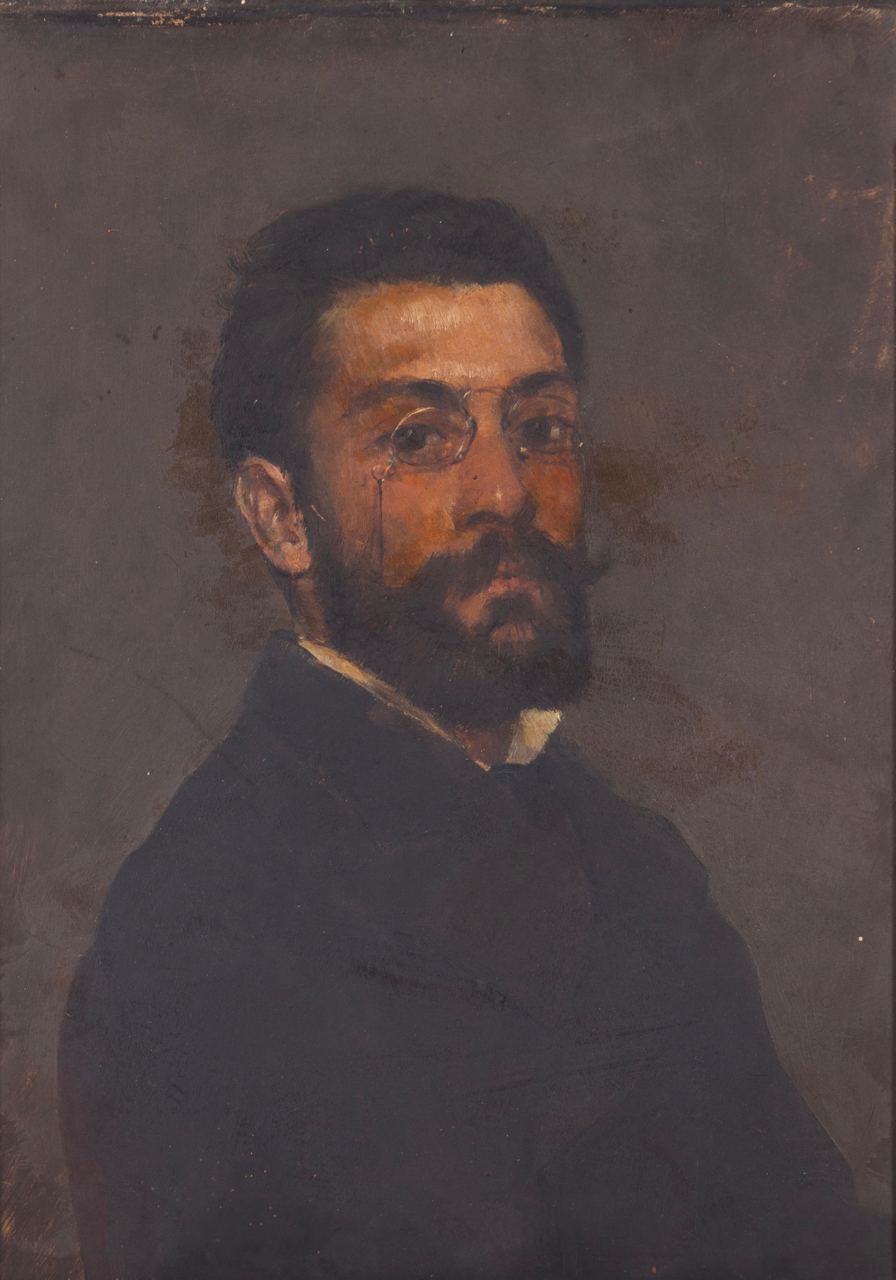

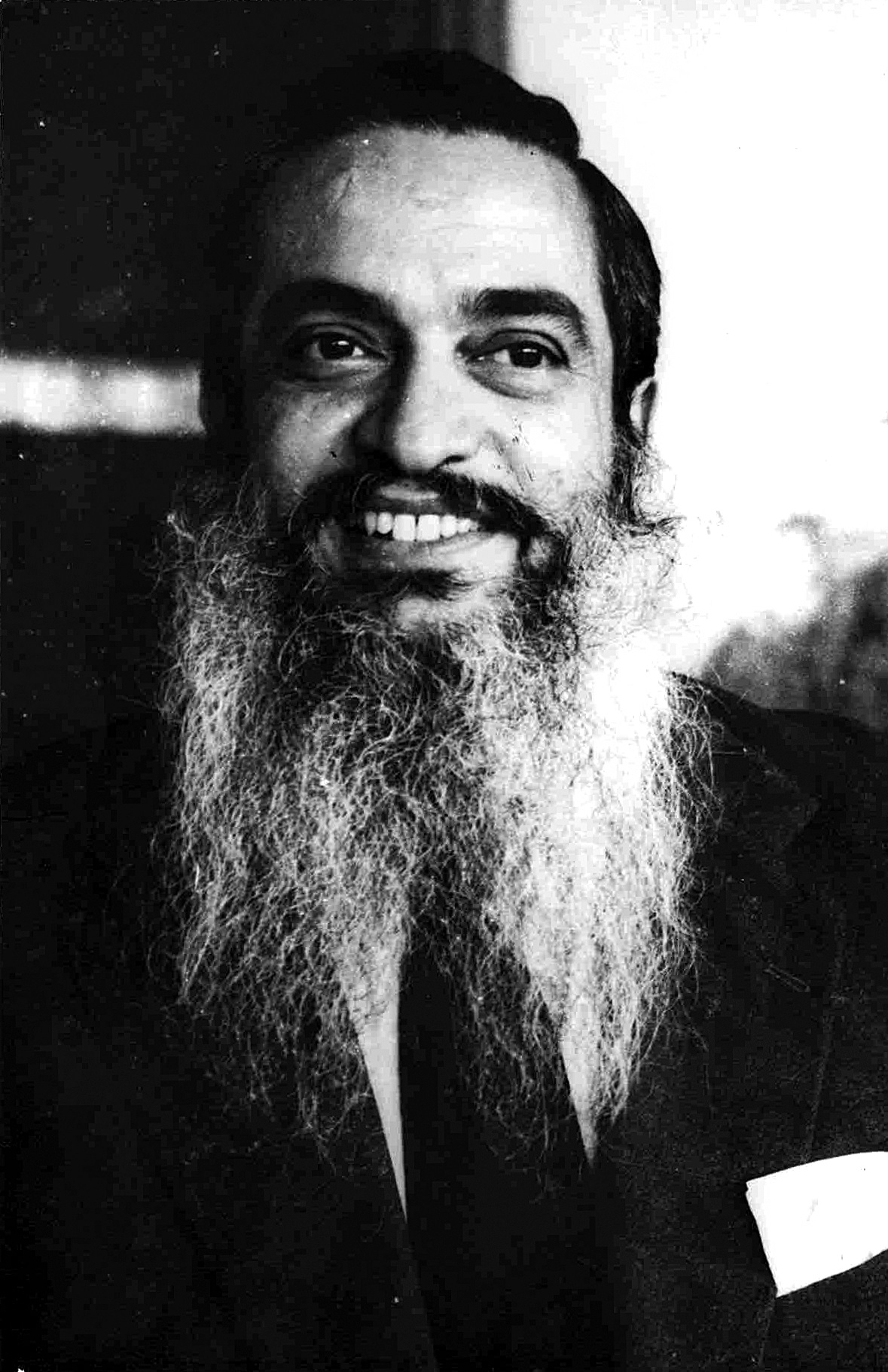

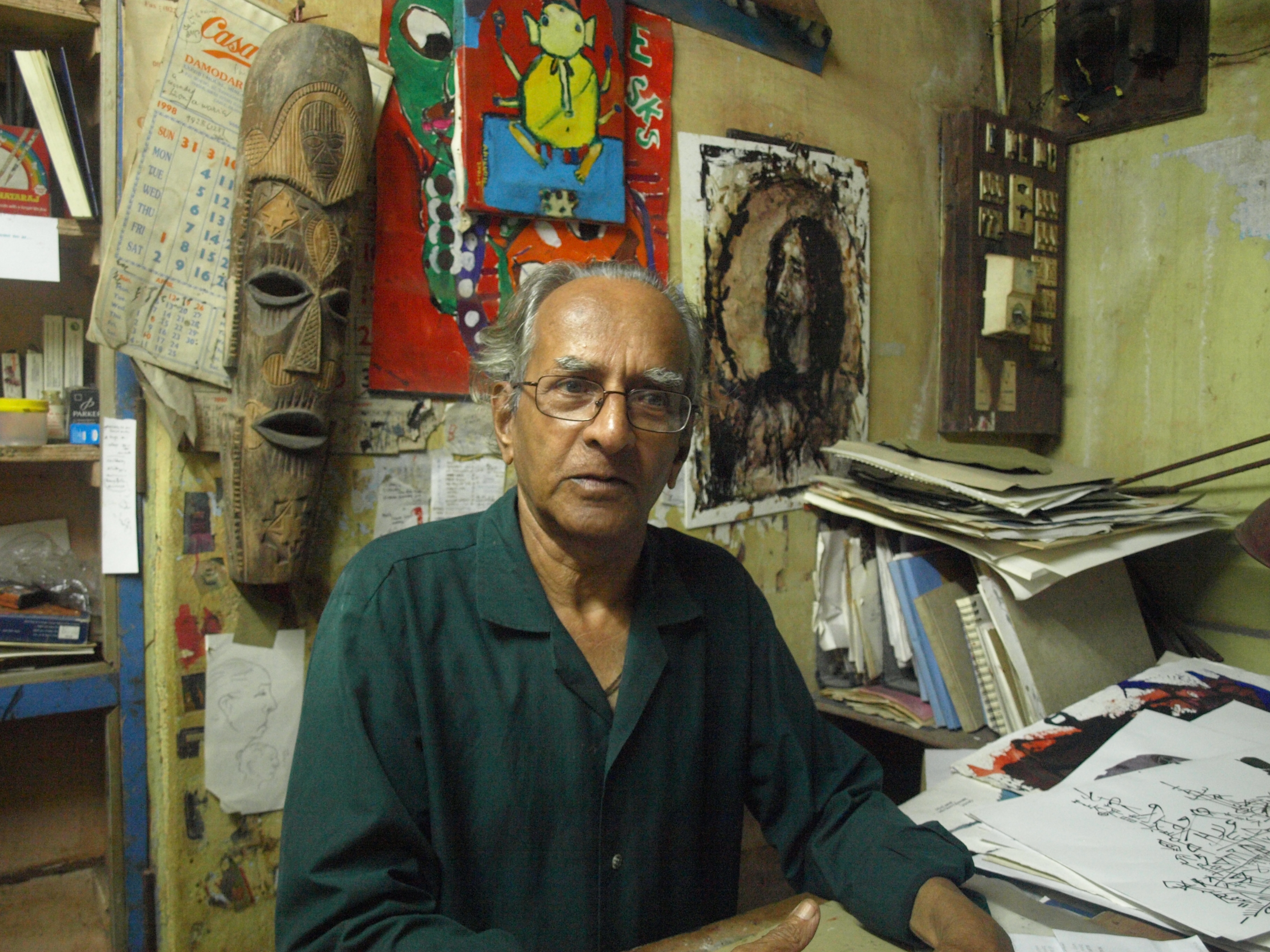

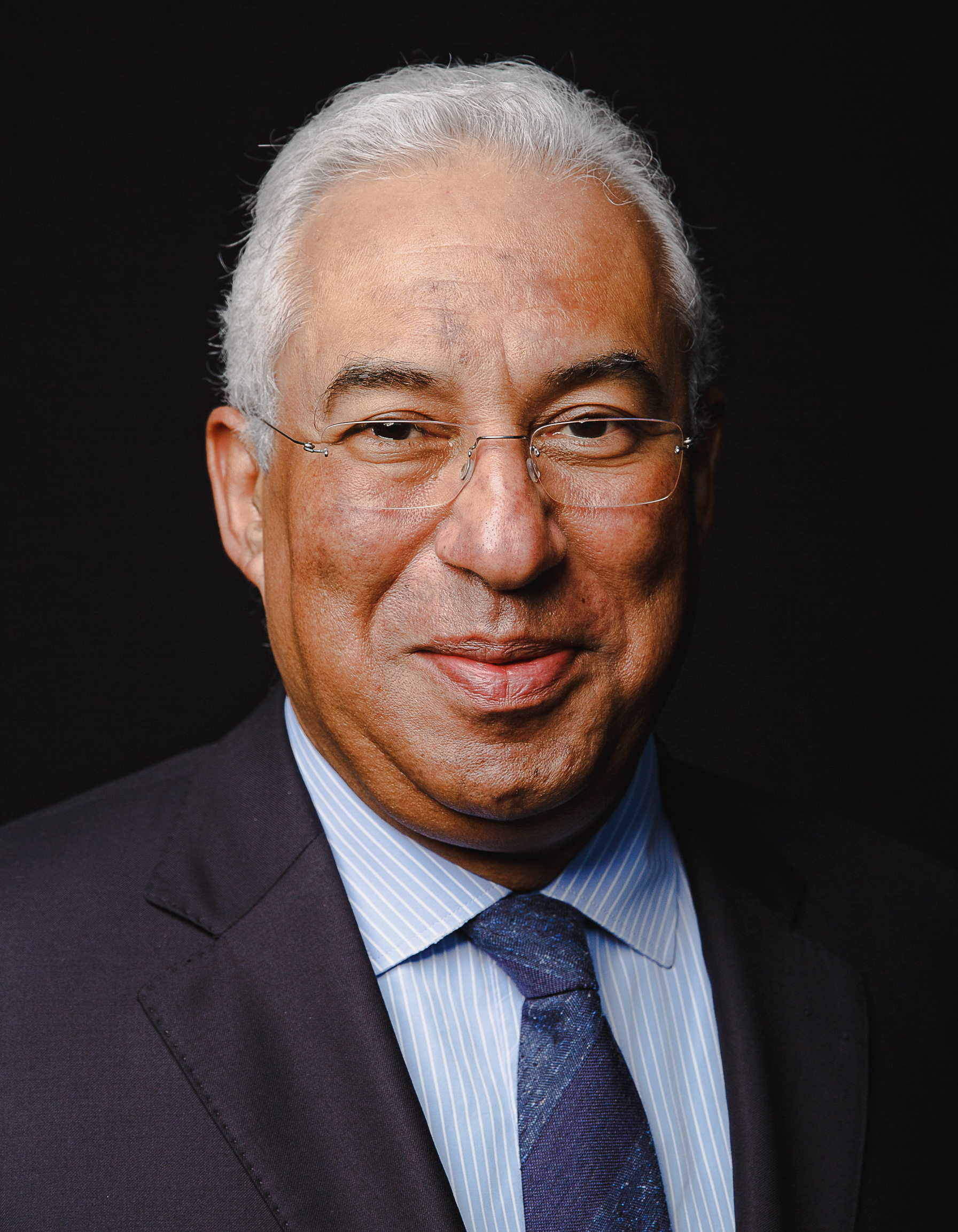

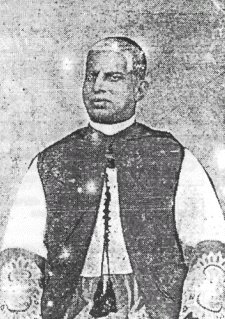

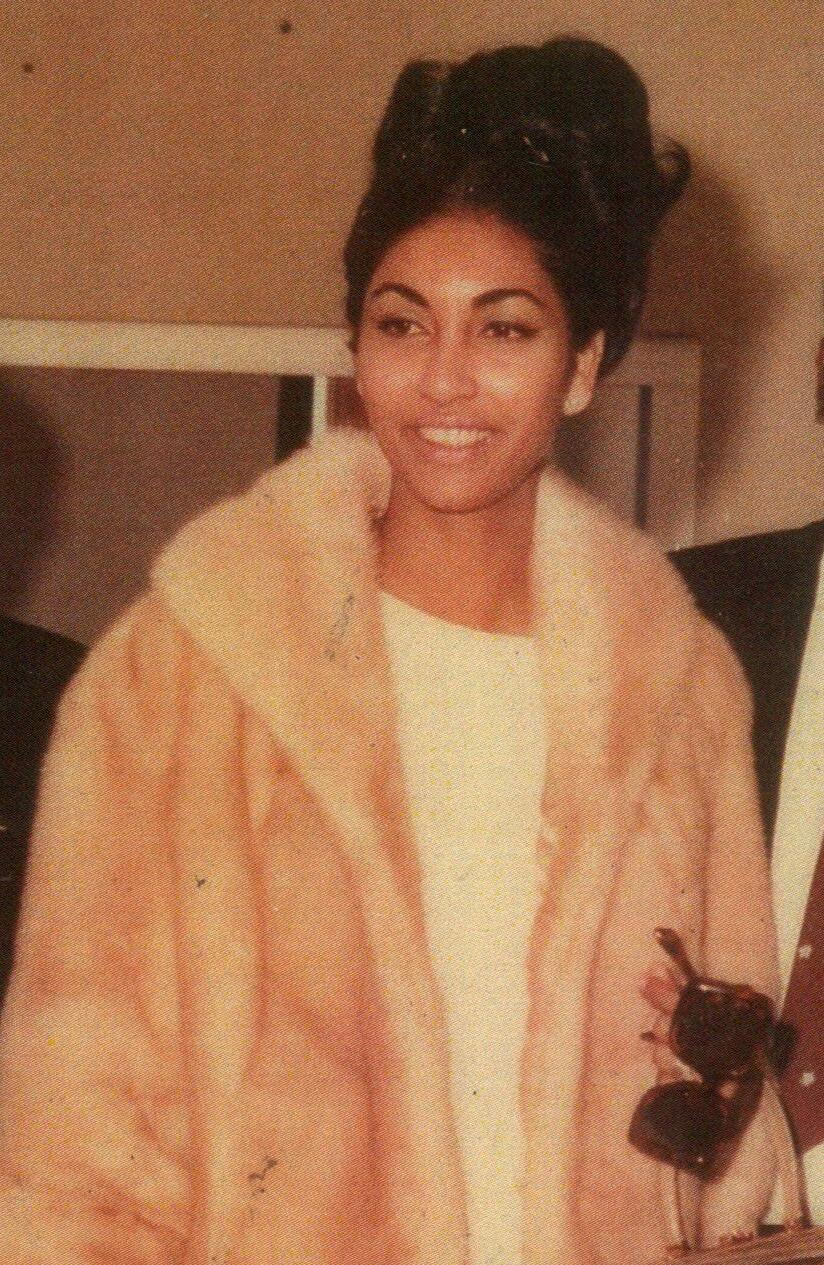

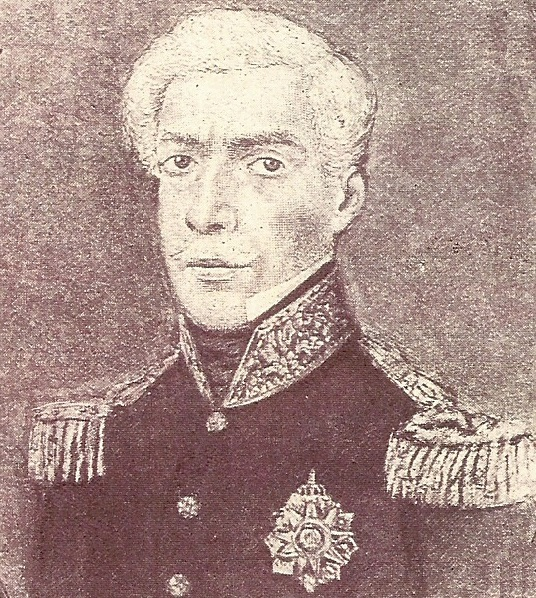

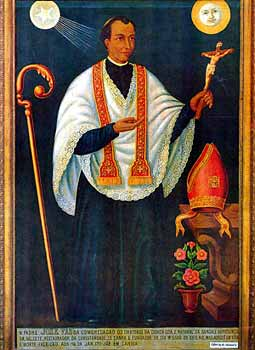

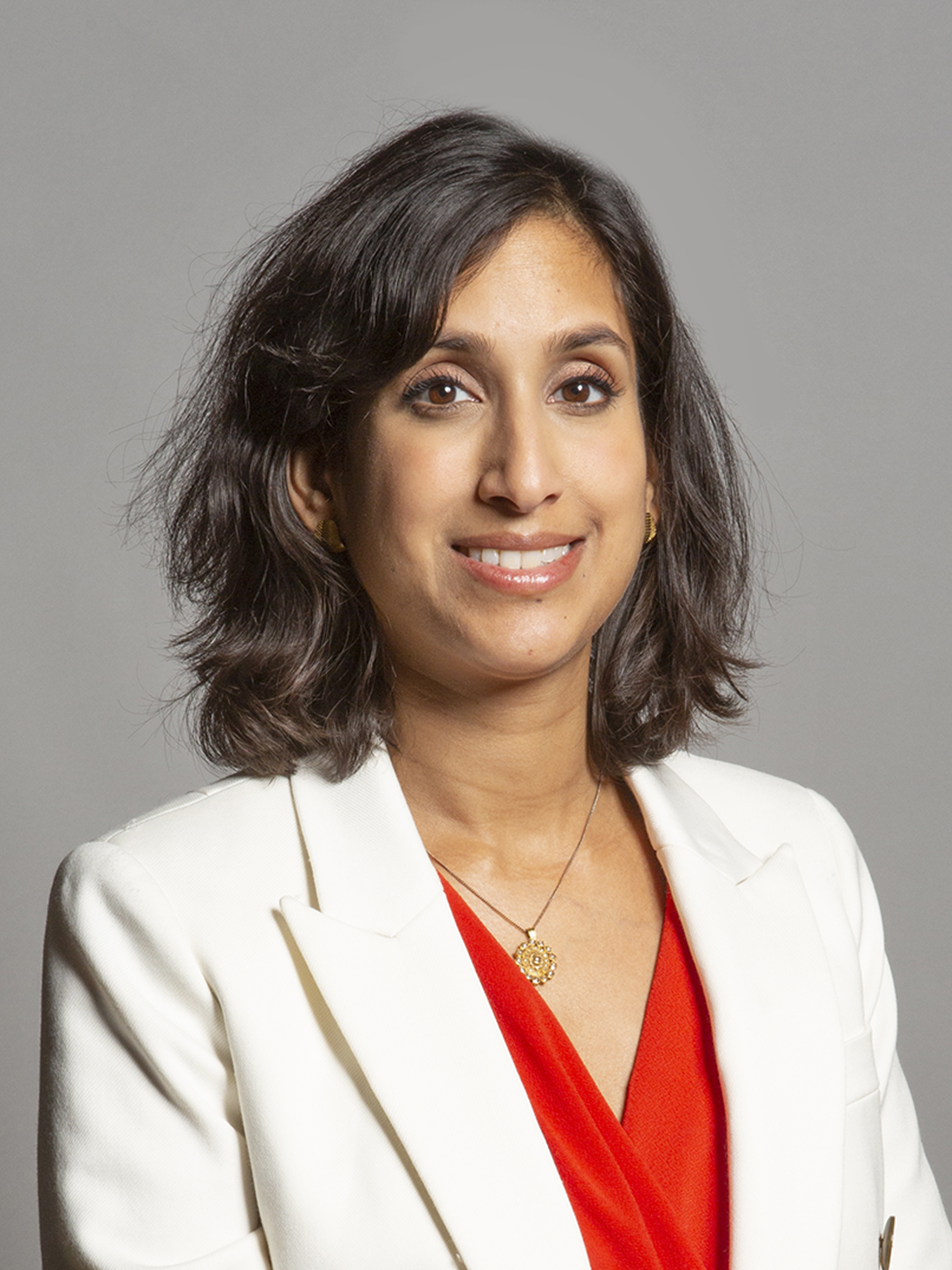

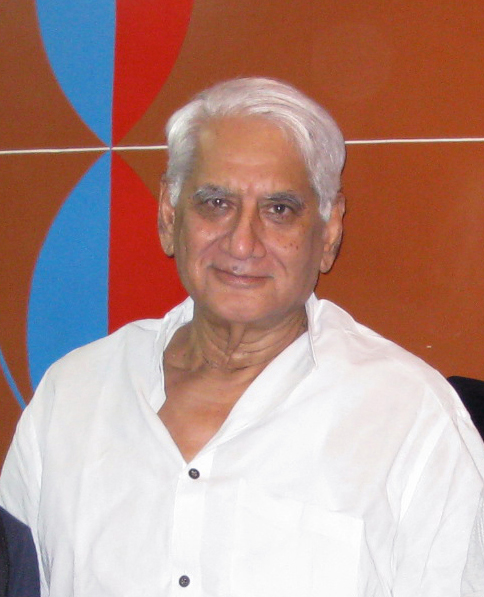

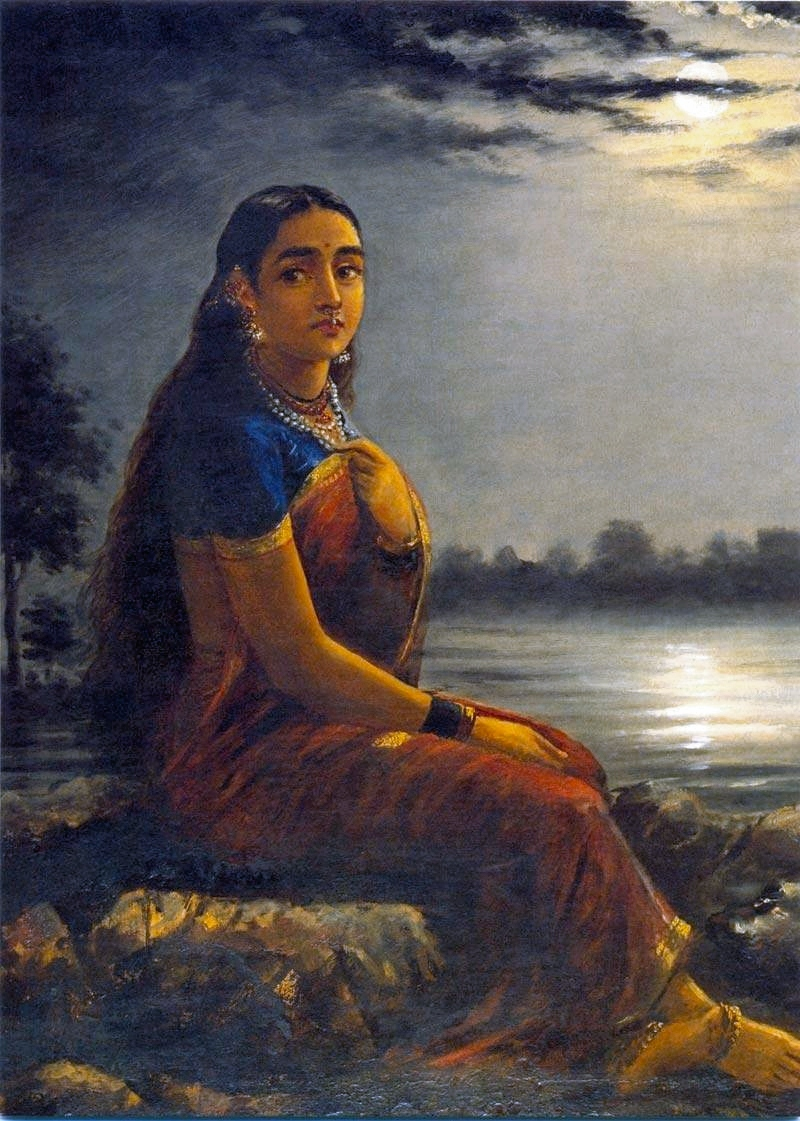

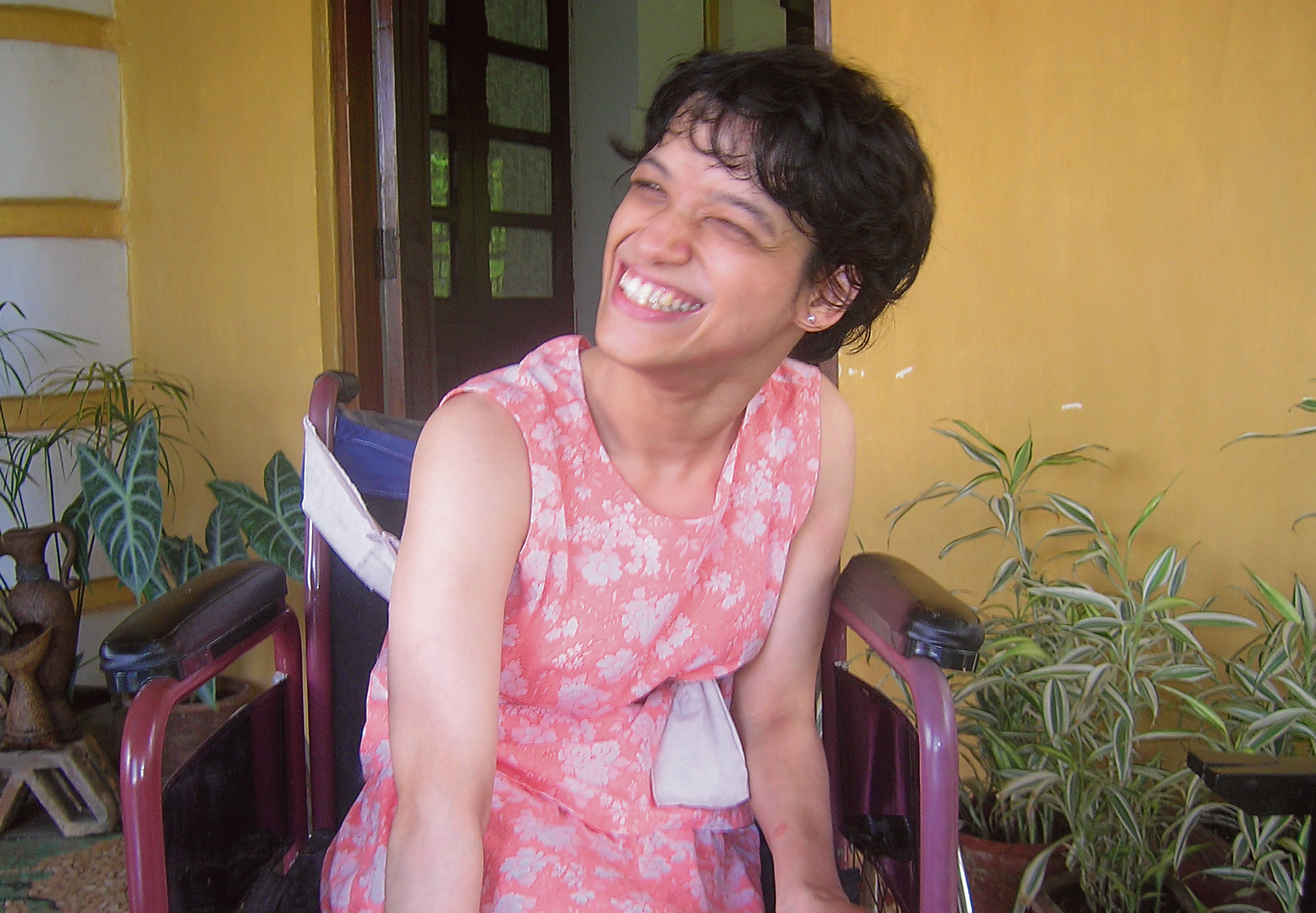
Jaime Valfredo Rangel	Leena Fernandes	José Lisboa	Angela Trindade
António Figueiredo	Vimala Devi	Narana Coissoró	António Rodrigues
Jack de Sequeira	Vamona Navelcar	António Costa	M. C. Albuquerque
Sebastião Dalgado	Reita Faria	Braz Fernandes	Joseph Vaz
Claire Coutinho	Charles Correa	Anjanibai Malpekar	Frederika Menezes
- (Some notable Goans) Some notable Goans (including those of ancestral descent)

Regions with significant populations
- Goa Maharashtra United Kingdom Portugal Rest of India Rest of the world: 650,000 (2017) (Note: This includes only the native Goan population); 150,000; 149,000 (Note: of which 25,000 in Swindon alone); 100,000 (Note: of which the overwhelming majority are Goan Catholics); 200,000; 600,000 (2000)

Languages
- Primary: Goan Konkani; Additional: Marathi (incl. Bombay Mahratti), Hindi–Urdu, Portuguese & English

Religion
- Global Predominance: Christianity; Global Minority: Hinduism, Islam and others

Related ethnic groups
- Other Konkani people: Bombayites, Bombay East Indians, Basseinites, Mangaloreans Norteiro people & Luso-Indians
- Due to mass emigration of people (mainly Goan Catholics) from Goa, as well as mass migration from mainland India, since 1961, the ethnic, religious and cultural demographics of Goa have been severely altered. This exchange of population has made the Goan natives a virtual minority in their homeland.: Note: This article is for information on the ethnic Goan people (many in diaspora), and not residents living within the state of Goa.

Goans (Romi Konkani: Goenkar, Portuguese: Goeses) is the demonym used to describe the people native to Goa, India, formerly part of Portuguese India (Estado Português da Índia). They form an ethno-linguistic group resulting from the assimilation of Indo-Aryan, Dravidian, Indo-Portuguese, Austro-Asiatic ethnic and/or linguistic ancestries. They speak different dialects of the Konkani language, collectively known as Goan Konkani. A small minority speak Portuguese. "Goanese", although sometimes used, is an incorrect term for Goans.

== Language ==
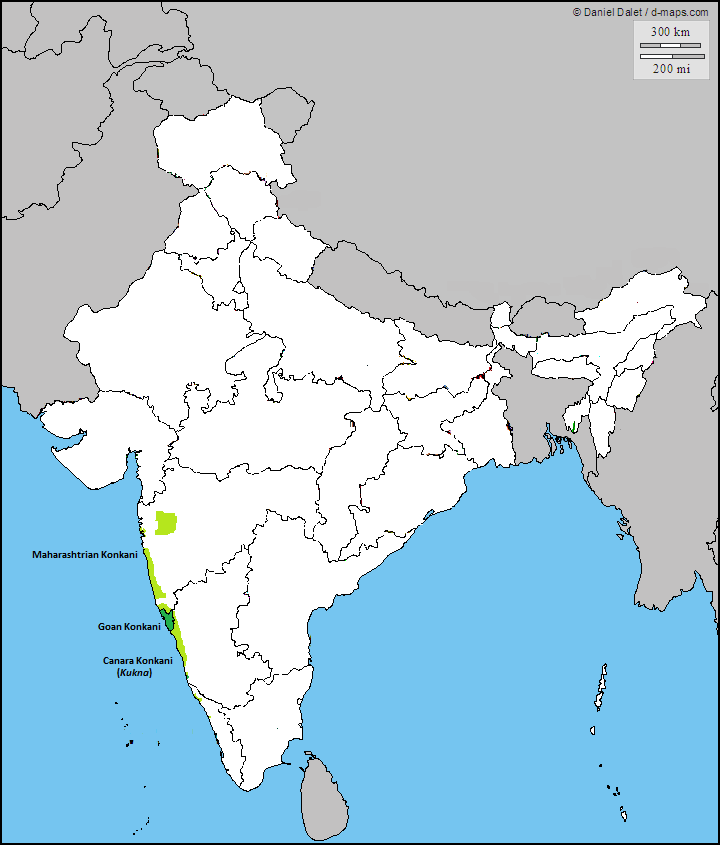
Geographic Distribution of Native Konkani Speakers within India

Goans are generally multilingual, but mainly speak the Konkani language, a Prakrit based language belonging to the Southern group of Indo-Aryan Languages. Various dialects of Konkani spoken by the Goans include Bardezkari, Saxtti, Pednekari and Antruz. The Konkani spoken by the Catholics is notably different from those of the Hindus, since it has a lot of Portuguese influence in its vocabulary.

Konkani was suppressed for official documentation use only not for unofficial use under the Portuguese governance, playing a minor part in education of the past generations. All Goans were educated in Portuguese in the past when Goa was an overseas province of Portugal. A small minority of Goans are descendants of the Portuguese (Luso-Indian ethnicity) and speak Portuguese. However, a number of native Christians also used Portuguese as their first language prior to 1961.

Goans use Devanagari (official) and Latin script (liturgical and historical) for education as well as communication (personal, formal and religious). However the entire liturgy of the Catholic church is solely in the Latin script, having been influenced by the Portuguese colonial rule. In the past other scripts such as Goykanadi, Modi, Kannada and Persian were also used, but later fell into disuse owing to many social, political and religious reasons.

Portuguese is still spoken as a first language by a number of Goans, though it is mainly restricted to upper-class Catholic families and the older generation. However, the annual number of Goans learning Portuguese as a second language has been continuously increasing in the 21st century through introduction in schools and the opening of Instituto Camões.

The Marathi language has played a significant role for Hindus near the northern borders of Goa close to Maharashtra and parts of Novas Conquistas (lit. new conquests). This is due to the influx of ethnic Marathi people since the 20th century.

== Religion ==
As per the 1909 statistics, the Catholic population stood at 293,628 out of a total population 365,291 (80.33%).

Within Goa, there has been a steady decline of Christianity as a percentage of the total population due to Goan emigration to other Indian cities (especially Mumbai) and foreign countries, and a rise of other religions due to non-Goan migration from the other states of India.

According to the 2011 census, out of the Indian population residing in Goa (1,458,545 persons), 66.1% were Hindu, 25.1% were Christian, 8.32% were Muslim, and 0.1% were Sikh.

=== Christianity ===
The Catholics display Portuguese influence, due to over 451 years of direct rule and interaction with the Portuguese people as an overseas province. Portuguese names are common among the Goan Catholics. A variation of the caste system is followed, but not rigidly due to Portuguese efforts to abolish caste discrimination among the local converts and homogenise them into a single entity. There are some distinct Bamonn, Chardó, Gauddo and Sudir communities in Goa that are mainly endogamous. Most Catholic families also share Portuguese ancestry, and some openly count themselves as mestiço (lit. mixed-race).

=== Hinduism ===
Goan Hindus refer to themselves as Konkane, meaning the residents of an area broadly identified as Konkan. Hindus in Goa are divided into many different castes and sub-castes, known as Jatis.

=== Islam ===
Only a small number of native Muslims remain and are known as Moir, the word is derived from the Portuguese Mouro, which means Moor. Muçulmano was the word later used in Portuguese to identify them, which is still the world used in today's Portuguese.

== Geographical distribution ==
Many overseas Goans have settled in the erstwhile British Empire and the United Kingdom mainly in south-west town of Swindon, Leicester in the East Midlands and in London (especially Wembley and Southall). Many Goans have migrated to the UK on Portuguese passports due to the UK being an EU member country up until the Brexit. According to the Office for National Statistics, as of June 2020, the population of EU Nationals (Indian-born Portuguese citizens) in UK was about 35,000.

=== Pre-Portuguese migrations ===
There are no definitive records of Goan migration prior to the Portuguese conquests in the region corresponding to nowadays Goa. One reason being that the Goan people were not a distinct ethnic group as yet.

=== Migrations from 1510–1700s (first phase) ===
The first recorded instances of significant emigrations of Goans could be traced back to the Portuguese conquest of Goa in 1510 and the subsequent flight of the surviving Muslim residents to the territories ruled by the Sultanate of Bijapur. Sizable numbers of Hindus also later fled to Mangalore and Kanara during the 16th–17th centuries due to the increasing Christianization of Goa. They were soon followed by some newly-converted Catholics, who fled the Goa Inquisition. There were also emigrations from Goa to Kanara to escape the War of the League of the Indies, the Dutch–Portuguese War, the Maratha Invasion of Goa (1683), taxation as well as epidemics during the same time period. Goan Catholics also started traveling overseas during the latter part of this time period. There were migrations of Goan Catholics to other parts of the global Portuguese Empire, such as Portugal, Mozambique, Ormuz, Muscat, Timor, Brasil, Malaca, Pegu, and Colombo. 48 Goan Catholics permanently migrated to Portugal during the 18th century. Goan involvement in Portuguese trade around the Indian Ocean involved both Hindu and Catholic Goan communities. However, upper-caste Goan Hindus did not travel to foreign countries due to the religious prohibition imposed by the Dharmaśāstras, which states that crossing salt water would corrupt oneself.

=== Migrations from 1800s–1950s (second phase) ===
During the Napoleonic Wars Goa was occupied by the British Raj, and many of their vessels were anchored in the Morumugão harbour. These ships were serviced by native Goans, who then left for British India once the ships had moved on. The Anglo-Portuguese Treaty of 1878 played an important role in speeding the emigration of Goans in the latter half of the 19th Century, since it gave the British the authority to construct the West of India Portuguese Railway, which connected the Velhas Conquistas to the Bombay Presidency. They primarily moved to the cities of Bombay (now Mumbai), Poona (now Pune), Calcutta (now Kolkata) and Karachi. Goans who moved to mainland India were of both, Christian as well as Hindu, origin.

A small number of Goans moved to Burma, to join the already established community in Pegu (now Bago). Another destination, mainly for the Catholic community, was Africa. Most of the emigrants hailed from the province of Bardes, due to their high literacy rate, and the Velhas Conquistas region in general. Immigration into Africa came to end after the Decolonisation of Africa, during the 1950-60s.

In 1880, there were already 29,216 Goans living outside of Goa. By 1954, the number had risen to 180,000.

=== Migration from 1960s–present (current phase) ===
After the Annexation of Goa in 1961 by the Republic of India, there has been a steep rise in the number of emigrants of Goan origin. Many had applied and were granted Portuguese passports in order to obtain a European residence. The educated class found it difficult to get jobs within Goa due to the high influx of non-Goans into Goa, and this encouraged many of them to move to the Gulf states.

Until the early 1970s there were substantial populations of Goans in the Middle East, Africa and Europe. There have also, historically, been Goans in former British colonies of Kenya, Uganda, and Tanzania, and Portuguese colonies of Mozambique and Angola. The end of colonial rule brought a subsequent process of Africanisation and a wave of expulsion of South Asians from Uganda (1972) and Malawi (1974) forced the community to migrate elsewhere.

In 2000, it was estimated that there are around 600,000 Goans living outside India.

=== Professions ===
Since the second phase of migrations, Goans have had a variety of professions. In British India they were personal butlers or physicians to the English and Parsi elite in India. On the Ships and Cruise liners they were sailors, stewards, chefs, musicians and dancers. Many have also been working on oil rigs. Many Goan doctors worked in African colonies of Portugal, as well as being also active in British India.

== See also ==
- Goan Catholics
- Goan Muslims
- Hinduism in Goa
- Goan literature
- Goan cuisine
- Konkani people
- List of people from Goa
- Goans in cricket
- Goans in football
- Luso-Asians
- Norteiro people
