= Goan Muslims =

Moir, Mouro
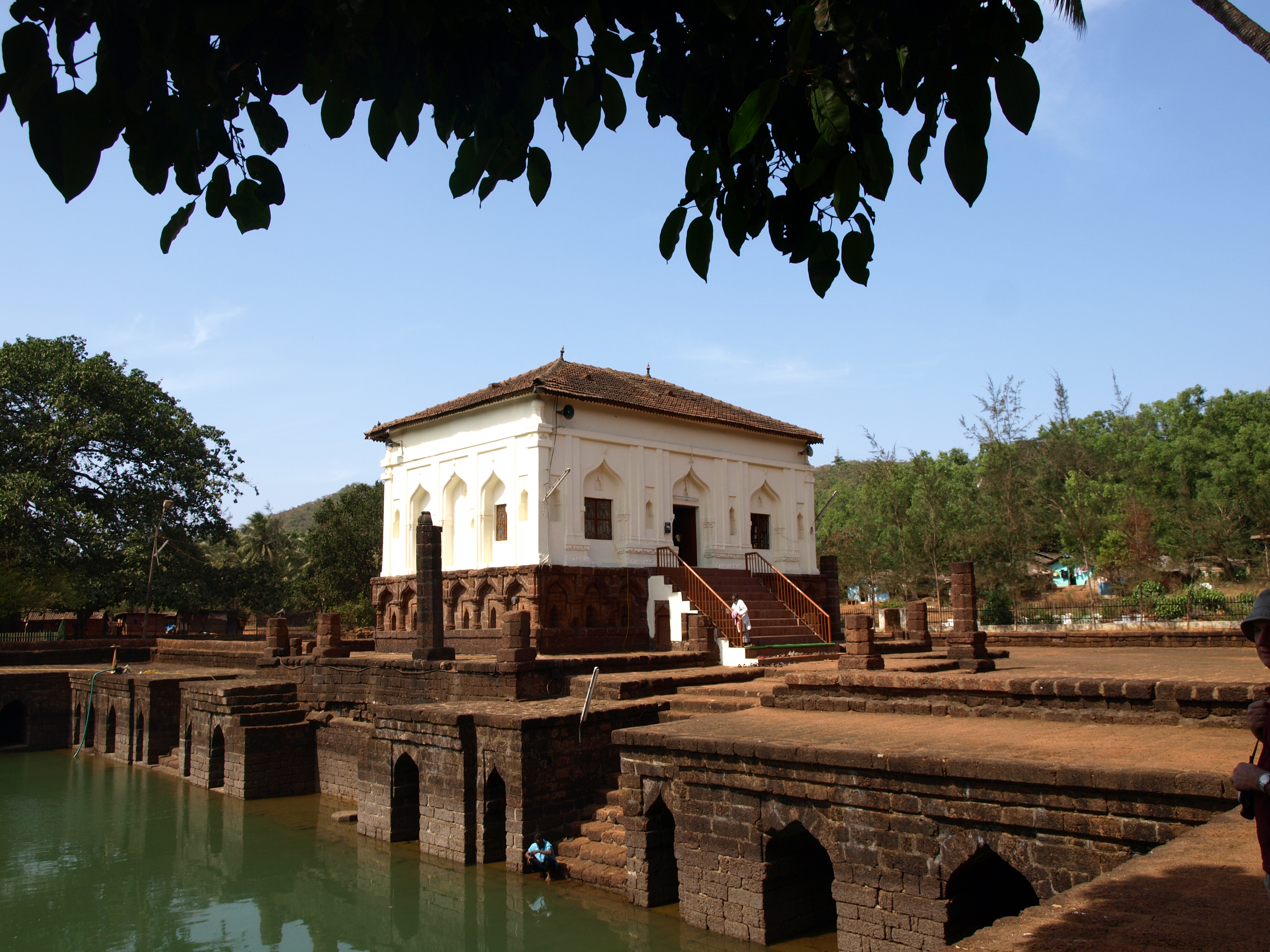
- Safa Masjid, Goa

Regions with significant populations
- Goa, especially Ponda, Bicholim, Sanguem, Quepem, Vasco da Gama

Languages
- Konkani, Urdu, Dakhini

Religion
- Sunni Islam

Related ethnic groups
- Other Goans, Nawayath, Konkani Muslims

The Goan Muslims are a minority community who follow Islam in the Indian coastal state of Goa, some are also present in the union territory of Damaon, Diu & Silvassa. They are native to Goa, unlike recent Muslim migrants from mainland India, and are commonly referred to as Moir by Goans in Goan Konkani.^{[a]} Moir is derived from the Portuguese word Mouro. The Portuguese called them Mouros because they (and the Spaniards) were in contact with the Moors, people of predominantly Muslim Maghreb country, who had conquered and colonised the Iberian peninsula for centuries.

== History ==
=== Early Islamic maritime references to Goa ===
Goa was known to Arab and Persian maritime writers as an important port region on the western coast of India. Medieval Islamic geographical traditions refer to a port called Sindabur (also written as Sindabūr or Sandabur), which has been associated by historians with the Goa region.

In the Turkish-language nautical work Mohit, written in 554 AH (1159 CE) by Sidi Ali Kodupon, Goa is referred to as Kuvah-Sindabur. The name combines the terms Kuvah (Goa) and Sindabur, a name used in Islamic maritime traditions for the Goa region.

The identification of Sindabur has been discussed by historians. Some scholars associate it with Chandrapura (modern Chandor), an early political and commercial centre of Goa, while others connect it with the wider Goa port region. These references indicate the importance of Goa's coastal settlements within the maritime networks of the western Indian Ocean.

The references to Sindabur and Kuvah-Sindabur demonstrate that Goa was already integrated into the wider Islamic maritime world before the establishment of Muslim-ruled states in the Deccan. Arab and Persian merchants participated in trade along the Konkan coast, connecting ports in western India with Arabia, the Persian Gulf, and other regions of the Indian Ocean.

The copper plate of Kadamba Jayakesi I refers to the Muslim Minister named Chadma. While Kadamba ruler Gullhadeva I was sailing towards Somanath, his ship got involved in a naval accident and the mast of his ship broke. His grandson Jayakesi I gave Chadma, the privilege of levying the taxes on small and big boats. The amount collected by way of taxes was utilized for the maintenance of the mosques built in Goa at Merces). Later Muslim sultans from North India migrated to Goa by force of conquest and established their society; this was the first major influx of Muslims into Goa, which led some local Hindus to migrate elsewhere. After Malik Kafur invasion and subsequently during the rule of Sultanate, there were Muslim Officers in Goa like Malik Bahadur. After the downfall of the Goa Kadamba, some Muslims might have migrated to Bhatkal and Honavar. The Nawayaths of Bhatkal are the descendant of Muslim community and once lived in Goa.

The Delhi Sultanate took over Goa in 1312. In turn, they were forced to surrender Goa by 1370 to Harihara I of Vijayanagara. The Vijayanagara monarchs ruled Goa for the next hundred years (until 1469), before it passed to the Bahmani sultans of Gulbarga. After the Bahmani Sultanate collapsed the Adil Shahis of Bijapur took over, making Velha Goa their ancillary capital. During this era, Muslim pilgrims from all over India embarked on their journey to Mecca from Goa. Thus by this time Muslim community evolved in Goa.

By the time the Portuguese arrived in 1510, the population of Tiswadi had a vast number of Muslim population. Afonso de Albuquerque took the help of Timoji and defeated the ruling Bijapur king Yusuf Adil Shah during the Portuguese conquest of Goa. The Muslim residents of Goa were exiled (e.g. Benastarim) or killed (e.g. Velha Goa) by the Portuguese and the local Hindus. All the mosques were destroyed and churches were built on them.

From 1560 to 1821, the Goa Inquisition was established. One of its primary targets were crypto-Muslims of North African origin who had immigrated to Goa from the Iberian peninsula following the Portuguese conquest. Of the 1,582 persons convicted between 1560 and 1623, 45.2% were convicted for offenses related to Judaism and Islam. However, a compilation of the auto-da-fé statistics of the Goa Inquisition from 1560 to 1821 revealed that a grand total of only 57 persons were burnt in the flesh and 64 in effigy (i.e. a statue resembling the person). All the burnt were convicted as relapsed heretics or for sodomy.

=== Under Portuguese rule ===
Albuquerque's initial hold on the city in 1510 was tenuous, and he withdrew to avoid a counterattack that might have been supported by the restive population. The forces of Ismail Adil Shah retook the city in May 1510, before the Portuguese recaptured it later that year.

== Demography ==
Native Goan Muslims are concentrated in the Novas Conquistas regions of Sattari, Bicholim, Sanguem, Ponda, Betul, Salcete, Tiswadi, Canacona, Pilar, Old Goa, Bardez and some areas of the coast of Vasco Da Gama. Their language parallels Dakhini of the Deccan Plateau. This dialect of Urdu has heavy Konkani influence and may be considered the "Konkani slang" of Goan Muslims. Goan Muslims are bilingual (speaking Konkani outside the home); mostly are educated in Portuguese, and they use the Perso-Arabic and Devanagari scripts for written communication. Muslims resident in Goa constituted 8.33% of Goa population in 2011, but of these only a tiny minority are native Goans.

== Culture ==
=== Castes ===
The majority of Goan Muslims follow Sunni Islam, the predominant groups being that of:

- Mulla's (Mulam/Mullam in Portuguese),
- Muzawar's (Muzavor in Portuguese),
- Sayyid's (Soiada/Soid in Portuguese),
- Shaikh's (Xec in Portuguese),
- Khan's (Can in Portuguese),
- Shaa's (Xaa in Portuguese),
- Kazi's (Cazi in Portuguese).
- Beig's (BEC in Portuguese),
- Mohammed's (Mamod in Portuguese),

=== Festivals ===
They observe all Muslim holidays and festivals such as Ramadan, Eid al-Fitr, Eid al-Adha and Eid-e-Milad.

=== Inter-Communal Relations ===
Goan Muslims are vastly outnumbered in Goa by non-Goan Muslims, because of the mass immigration taking place from other states of India since the Annexation of Goa in 1961. Muslims have generally been tolerated in Goa until this century. Anti-Muslim riots broke out after a local Hindu mob demolished a madrassa on 2–3 March 2006, which had been constructed by Muslim immigrants from Karnataka on the outskirts of Sanvordem-Curchorem. The anti-Muslim violence, which continued for three days before the Central Industrial Security Force stepped in, saw property worth crores of rupees destroyed.

=== Law ===
Goan Muslims as well as Goans from other religions are governed by a Portuguese Civil code based on the progressive old Portuguese Family Laws. Unsuccessful attempts were made for a change towards enforcing Muslim personal law since the early 1970s. Personal law of Hindus and Muslims is not recognized in Goa.

== Cuisine ==
Like Goans of other faiths, Goan Muslims' staple foods are rice and fish. Sea food is preferred to mutton and biryani is a delicacy only during festivals like Eid.

== Notes ==
- Hindu, Kristao, Moir, sogle bhau (transl. Hindus, Christians and Muslims are all brothers.)
