= Moors =

Historical term used for various Muslim peoples

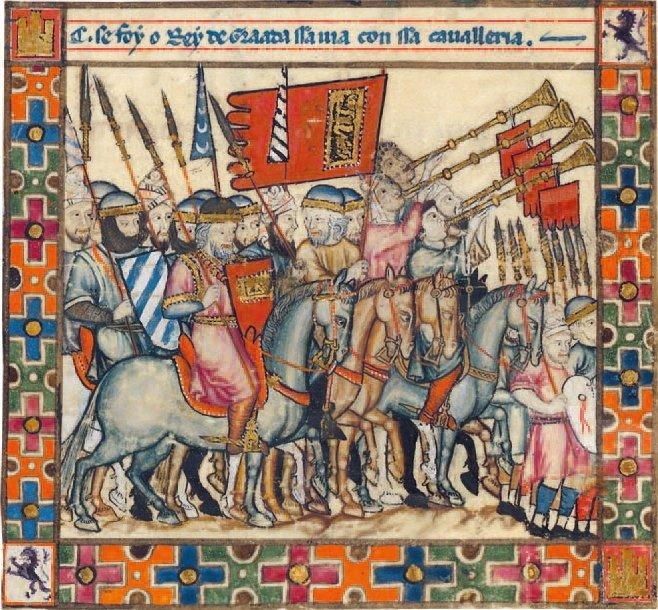
Depiction of Muslim army in Iberia, from The Cantigas de Santa Maria

Moor is an exonym used in European languages to designate primarily the Muslim populations of North Africa (the Maghreb) and the Iberian Peninsula (particularly al-Andalus) during the Middle Ages.

Moors are not a single, distinct or self-defined people. Europeans of the Middle Ages and the early modern period variously applied the name to Arabs, Berbers, Muslim Europeans, and black peoples. The term has been used in a broad sense to refer to Muslims in general, especially those of Arab or Berber descent, whether living in al-Andalus or North Africa. Related terms such as English "Blackamoor" were also used to refer to black Africans generally in the early modern period. The 1911 Encyclopædia Britannica observed that the term "Moors" had "no real ethnological value". The word has racial connotations and it has fallen out of fashion among scholars since the mid-20th century.

The word is also used when denoting various other specific ethnic groups in western Africa and some parts of Asia. During the colonial era, the Portuguese introduced the names "Ceylon Moors" and "Indian Moors" in South Asia and Sri Lanka, now official ethnic designations on the island nation, and the Bengali Muslims were also called Moors. In the Philippines, the longstanding Muslim community, which predates the arrival of the Spanish, now self-identifies as the "Moro people", an exonym introduced by Spanish colonizers due to their Muslim faith. In modern-day Mauritania, the terms "black Moors" and "white Moors" are used to refer to the Haratin and Beidane peoples, respectively.

== Etymology ==
The etymology of the word "Moor" is uncertain, although it could be traced back to the Phoenician term Mahurin, meaning "Westerners". From Mahurin, the ancient Greeks derive Mauro, from which Latin derives Mauri. The word "Moor" is presumably of Phoenician origin. Some sources attribute a Hebrew origin to the word.

== Historical usage ==
=== Antiquity ===
During the classical period, the Romans interacted with, and later conquered, parts of Mauretania, a state that covered modern northern Morocco, western Algeria, and the Spanish cities Ceuta and Melilla. The Berber tribes of the region were noted in the Classics as Mauri, which was subsequently rendered as "Moors" in English and in related variations in other European languages. Mauri (Ancient Greek: Μαῦροι) is recorded as the native name by Strabo in the early 1st century. This appellation was also adopted into Latin, whereas the Greek name for the tribe was Maurusii (Ancient Greek: Μαυρούσιοι). The Moors were also mentioned by Tacitus as having revolted against the Roman Empire in 24 AD.

=== Medieval and early modern Europe ===
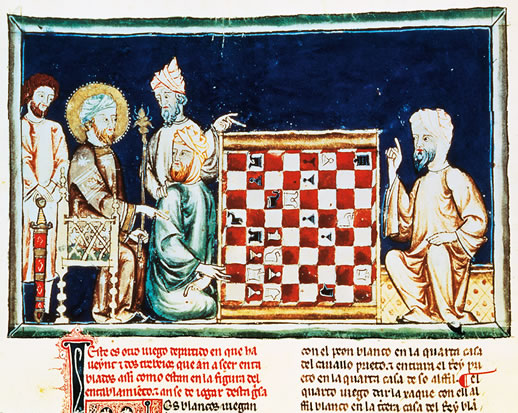
Miniature from Alfonso X's Book of chess, dice and boards, completed in 1283, showing Muslims from Andalusia playing chess. Europeans loosely called the Muslims Moors, blending the name for both people of Arab, Berber, or other ancestry.

During the Latin Middle Ages, Mauri was used to refer to Berbers and Arabs in the coastal regions of Northwest Africa. The 16th century scholar Leo Africanus (c. 1494–1554) identified the Moors (Mauri) as the native Berber inhabitants of the former Roman Africa Province (Roman Africans).

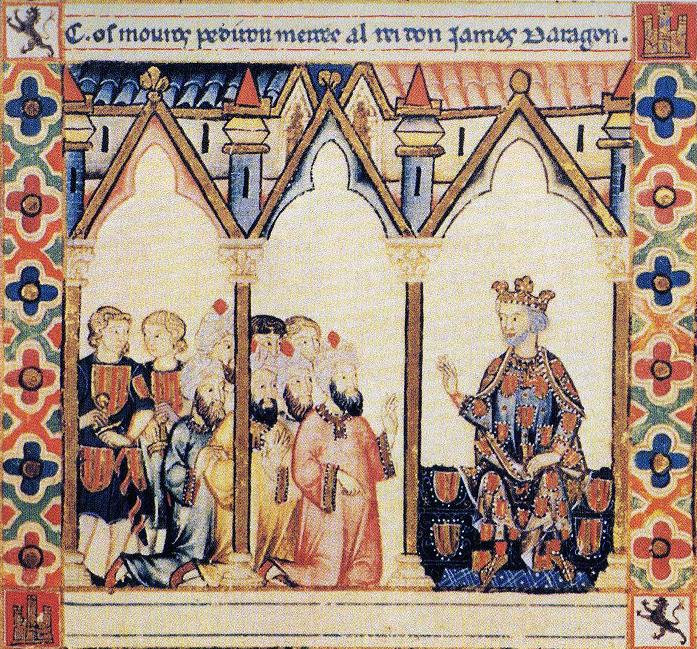
The Moors request permission from James I of Aragón, from Cantigas de Santa Maria

As it was Muslim Berbers and Arabs who conquered the Iberian Peninsula from North Africa in 711, the word has been applied to the inhabitants of the peninsula under Muslim rule (known in this context as al-Andalus). The term could also be applied to the Muslims of Sicily, who began to arrive there during the Aghlabid conquest of the 9th century. The word passed into Spanish, Portuguese, and Italian as Moros or other cognates. The Emirate of Granada, the last Muslim state on the Iberian Peninsula, was conquered by the Spanish in 1492, resulting in all remaining Muslims in this area to pass under Christian rule. These Muslims and their descendants were thereafter known as Moriscos ('Moorish' or 'Moor-like') up until their final expulsion from Spain in 1609.

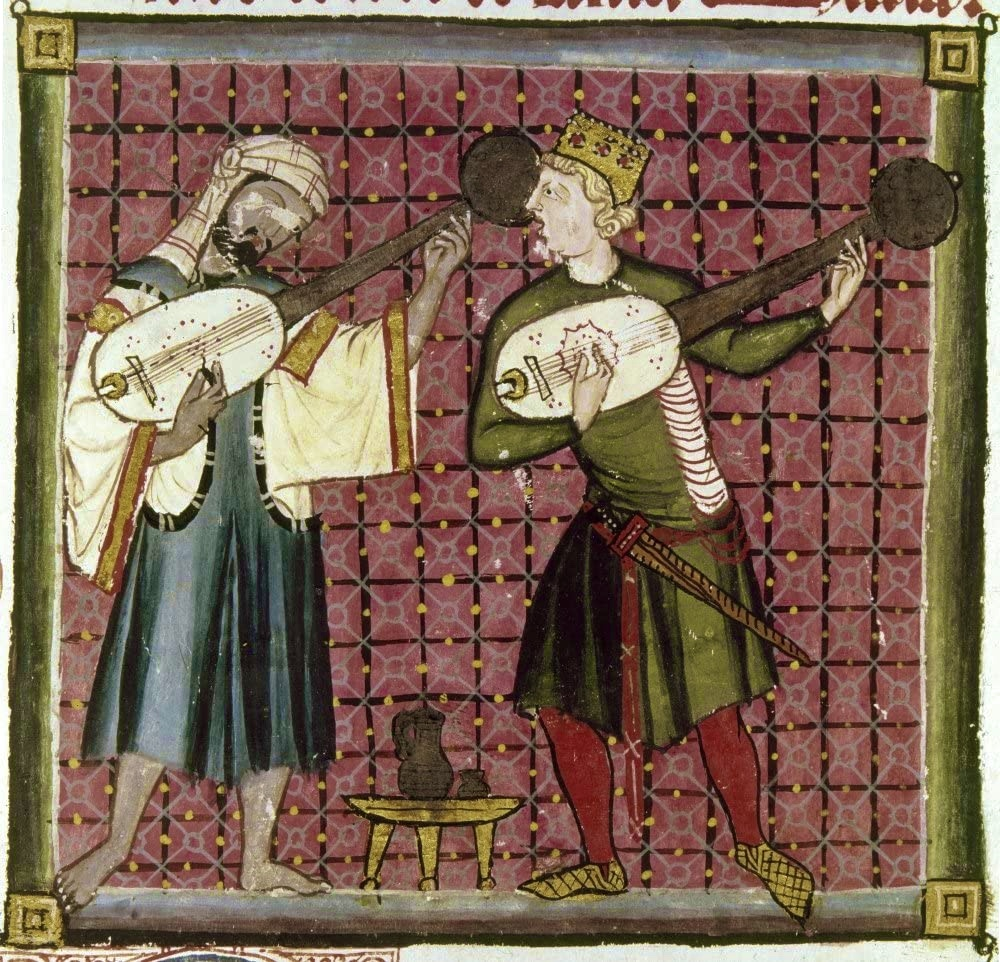
Illustration of Muslim musician (left) alongside a Christian musician (right) in a codice of the 13th-century Cantigas de Santa Maria

The word was more commonly also a racial term for dark-skinned or black people, which is the meaning with which it also passed into English as early as the 14th century. In medieval European literature, the term often denotes Muslim foes of Christian Europe in a derogatory manner. During the Renaissance and the early modern period, it became associated with more romanticized depictions, even when Muslims were otherwise depicted negatively. In works of this period, the "Moor" may appear as a courageous warrior, a sexually overt personality, or other stereotypes. Examples of such characters are found in the Spanish Poem of the Cid and in Shakespeare's Othello.

Since the early modern period, "Moors" or "Moorish" has also been used by western historians and scholars to refer to the history and heterogeneous people of Islamic North Africa and al-Andalus. Since the mid-20th century, however, this usage has declined, though it sometimes persists to denote related topics, such as "Moorish" architecture. The word otherwise retains some racial connotations.

=== "White Moors" and "Black Moors" ===
The existence of both "white Moors" and "black Moors" is attested in historical literature from the late Middle Ages onwards. Late medieval Portuguese sources often referred to "Arabian" and "Turkish" Moors as mouros brancos ('white moors'), to North African Berbers as mouras da terra ('moors of the land'), and to sub-Saharan Africans as mouros negros ('black moors'). During the early modern period, the term "Blackamoor" was used in English to describe black Africans, alongside other racial terms.

In the 1453 chronicle The Discovery and Conquest of Guinea the Portuguese chronicler Gomes Eannes de Azurara writes: "Dinis Diaz, leaving Portugal with his company, never lowered sail till he had passed the land of the Moors and arrived in the land of the blacks, that is called Guinea." The 'land of the blacks' here refers to the regions south of the Sahara known as bilād as-sūdān in Medieval Arabic texts. De Azurara also notes the existence of 'blacks' among the Moors, stating that "these blacks were Moors like the others, though their slaves, in accordance with ancient custom". In The First Book of the Introduction of Knowledge (1542) the English author Andrew Borde writes that "Barbary is a great country, and plentiful of fruit, wine and corn. The inhabitants be called the Moors; there be white Moors and black Moors; they be infidels and unchristened." Borde includes a poem about "a black Moor born in Barbary" who will be "a good diligent slave". In his Description of Africa (1550) The Andalusi author Leo Africanus - described as a Moor by the English translator John Pory (1600) - refers to the Berber populations of Barbary and Numidia (e.g. North Africa) as "white Africans", translated by Pory as "white or tawny Moors".

The terms "white Moor" and "black Moor" are still used in modern-day Mauritania, where the Moorish population is divided into the socially dominant 'white Moors' of Berber and Arab origin (also known as Beidanes), and 'black Moors' (also known as Haratines) who are former slaves.

The Haratines are almost exclusively of black origin, but are closely associated with the Moorish population in terms of language and culture. In the words of Samuel Cotton: "[they] have lost virtually every aspect of their African origins except their skin color." Their Moorish culture and their language are the result of generations of enslavement by the Moors. They are also referred to as "black Moors" to differentiate them from the "white Moors" who enslaved them, and from black Mauritanians who have not been enslaved by the Moors.

== Modern meanings ==
Apart from its historic associations and context, Moor and Moorish designate a specific ethnic group speaking Hassaniya Arabic. They inhabit Mauritania and parts of Algeria, Western Sahara, Tunisia, Morocco, Niger, and Mali. In Niger and Mali, these peoples are also known as the Azawagh Arabs, after the Azawagh region of the Sahara.

The authoritative dictionary of the Spanish language does not list any derogatory meaning for the word moro, a term generally referring to people of Maghrebian origin in particular or Muslims in general. Some authors have pointed out that in modern colloquial Spanish use of the term moro is derogatory for Moroccans in particular.

In the Philippines, a former Spanish colony, many modern Filipinos call the large, local Muslim minority concentrated in Mindanao and other southern islands Moros. The word is a catch-all term, as Moro may come from several distinct ethno-linguistic groups such as the Maranao people. The term was introduced by Spanish colonisers, and has since been appropriated by Filipino Muslims as an endonym, with many self-identifying as members of the Bangsamoro "Moro Nation".

Moreno can mean "dark-skinned" in Spain, Portugal, Brazil, and the Philippines. Among Spanish speakers, moro came to have a broader meaning, applied to both Filipino Moros from Mindanao, and the moriscos of Granada. Moro refers to all things dark, as in "Moor", moreno, etc. It was also used as a nickname; for instance, the Milanese Duke Ludovico Sforza was called Il Moro because of his dark complexion.

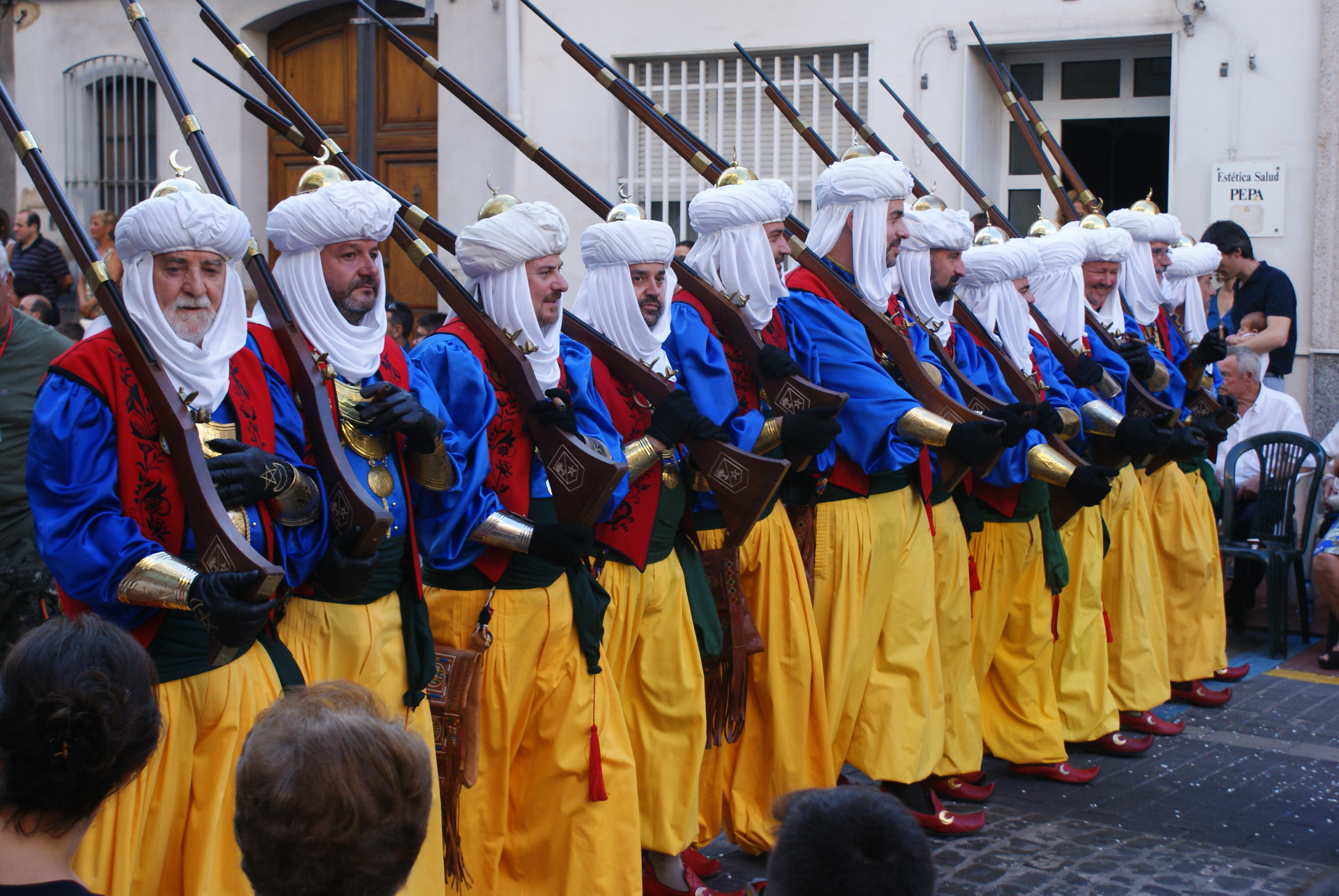
Moros y Cristianos festival in Oliva.

In Portugal, mouro (feminine, moura) may refer to supernatural beings known as enchanted moura, where "Moor" implies "alien" and "non-Christian". These beings were siren-like fairies with golden or reddish hair and a fair face. They were believed to have magical properties. From this root, the name moor is applied to unbaptized children, meaning not Christian. In Basque, mairu means moor and also refers to a mythical people.

Muslims located in South Asia were distinguished by the Portuguese historians into two groups: Mouros da Terra ("Moors of the Land") and the Mouros da Arabia/Mouros de Meca ("Moors from Arabia/Mecca" or "Paradesi Muslims"). The Mouros da Terra were either descendants of any native convert (mostly from any of the former lower or untouchable castes) to Islam or descendants of a marriage alliance between a Middle Eastern individual and an Indian woman.

Within the context of Portuguese colonization, in Sri Lanka (Portuguese Ceylon), Muslims of Arab origin are called Ceylon Moors, not to be confused with "Indian Moors" of Sri Lanka (see Sri Lankan Moors). Sri Lankan Moors (a combination of "Ceylon Moors" and "Indian Moors") make up 12% of the population. The Ceylon Moors (unlike the Indian Moors) are descendants of Arab traders who settled there in the mid-6th century. When the Portuguese arrived in the early 16th century, they labelled all the Muslims in the island as Moors as they saw some of them resembling the Moors in North Africa. The Sri Lankan government continues to identify the Muslims in Sri Lanka as "Sri Lankan Moors", sub-categorised into "Ceylon Moors" and "Indian Moors".

The Goan Muslims—a minority community who follow Islam in the western Indian coastal state of Goa—are commonly referred as Moir (Konkani: मैर) by Goan Catholics and Hindus.^{[a]} Moir is derived from the Portuguese word mouro ("Moor").

== In heraldry ==
Coat of arms of Aragon with Moors' heads.

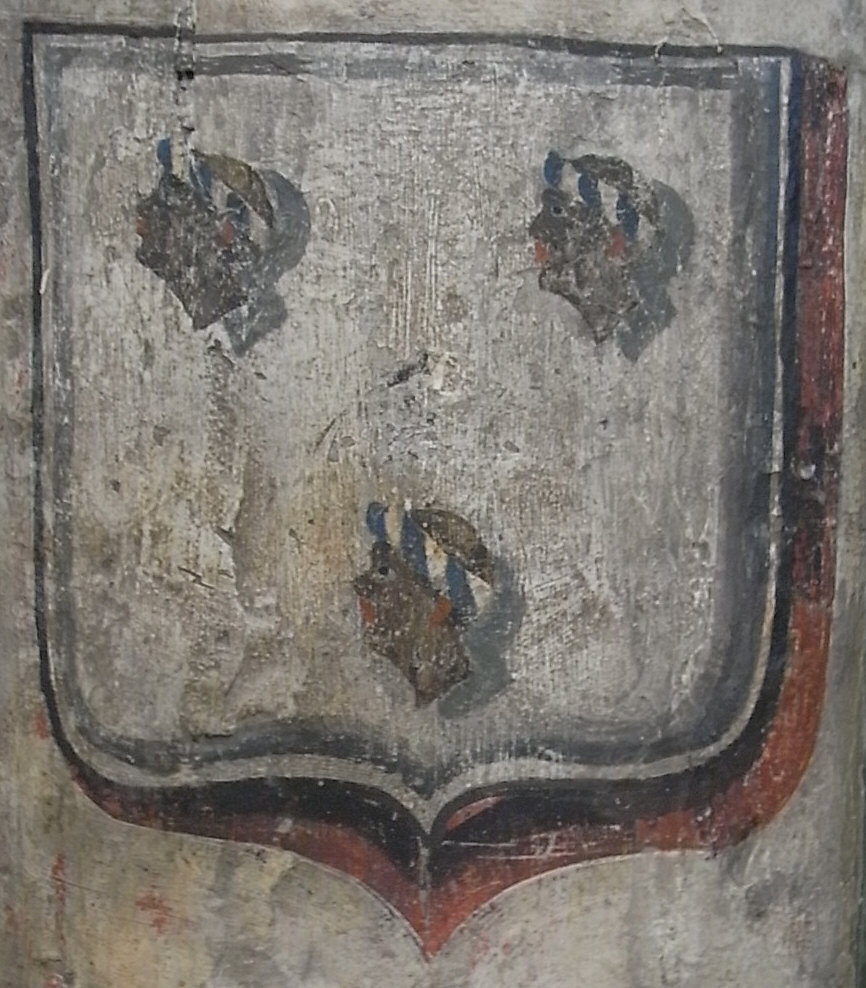
Arms of the wealthy Bristol merchant and shipper William II Canynges (d.1474), as depicted on his canopied tomb in St Mary Redcliffe Church, showing the couped heads of three Moors wreathed at the temples

Moors—or more frequently their heads, often crowned—appear with some frequency in medieval European heraldry, though less so since the Middle Ages. The term ascribed to them in Anglo-Norman blazon (the language of English heraldry) is maure, though they are also sometimes called moore, blackmoor, blackamoor or negro. Maures appear in European heraldry from at least as early as the 13th century, and some have been attested as early as the 11th century in Italy, where they have persisted in the local heraldry and vexillology well into modern times in Corsica and Sardinia.

Armigers bearing moors or moors' heads may have adopted them for any of several reasons, to include symbolizing military victories in the Crusades, as a pun on the bearer's name in the canting arms of Morese, Negri, Saraceni, etc., or in the case of Frederick II, possibly to demonstrate the reach of his empire. The arms of Pope Benedict XVI features a moor's head, crowned and collared red, in reference to the arms of Freising, Germany. In the case of Corsica and Sardinia, the blindfolded moors' heads in the four quarters have long been said to represent the four Moorish emirs who were defeated by Peter I of Aragon and Pamplona in the 11th century, the four moors' heads around a cross having been adopted to the arms of Aragon around 1281–1387, and Corsica and Sardinia having come under the dominion of the king of Aragon in 1297. In Corsica, the blindfolds were lifted to the brow in the 18th century as a way of expressing the island's newfound independence.

The use of Moors (and particularly their heads) as a heraldic symbol has been deprecated in modern North America. For example, the College of Arms of the Society for Creative Anachronism urges applicants to use them delicately to avoid causing offence.

== See also ==
- Saracen
- Mohammedan
- Turk (term for Muslims)
- Böszörmény
- Genetic history of the Iberian Peninsula
- Genetic studies on Moroccans
- Orientalism
- Ricote (Don Quixote)

== Notes ==
- ...Hindu Kristao Moir sogle bhau- Hindus, Christians and Muslims are all brothers...
