= Genetic studies on Moroccans =

DNA analysis of Moroccan populations

Human Y-chromosome DNA haplogroups in Morocco and the world.

Moroccan genetics encompasses the genetic history of the people of Morocco, and the genetic influence of this ancestry on world populations. It has been heavily influenced by geography.

In prehistoric times, the Sahara desert to the south and the Mediterranean Sea to the north were important geographical barriers to influx from Sub-Saharan Africa and Europe. However, West Asia and North Africa form a single land mass at the Sinai. Neolithic West Asian populations would have also been attracted to a wet Sahara, arriving either through the Suez, the Bab el-Mandeb or the Mediterranean.

As a result of these geographic influences, the genetic profile of the Moroccan population is a complex mosaic of autochthonous Maghrebi lineages, as well as North African, European, West Asian and West African elements in variable degrees. Though Northwest Africa has experienced gene flow from the surrounding regions, it has also undergone long periods of genetic isolation in some parts. This has allowed distinctive genetic markers to evolve in some Maghrebi populations, especially in certain isolated Berber-speaking groups.

The population of Morocco is genetically heterogenous. This is mostly due to the Arab migrations to the Maghreb, a demographic process that heavily implied gene flow and remodeled the genetic structure of the Maghreb. The J-M267 chromosome pool is derived not only from significant early Neolithic Revolution era dispersions from Western Asia, but to a much greater extent from recent expansions of Arab tribes from the Arabian Peninsula, during which both southern Qahtanite and northern Adnanite Arabs added to the heterogenous ethnic melting pot.

== Prehistory and antiquity ==
The area of present-day Morocco has been thought to have been inhabited since Paleolithic times, sometime between 90,000 and 190,000 BC, but that is no longer the case after the discovery of a 300,000 years Homo sapiens, and instead, it is now suggested that it has been inhabited since primordial times by humans by the same evidence. During the Upper Paleolithic, the Maghreb was more fertile than it is today, resembling a savanna more than today's arid landscape. 22,000 years ago, the Aterian culture which showed similarities with Cro-Magnon cultures of Eurasia was succeeded by the Iberomaurusian culture, which shared similarities with Iberian cultures. Skeletal similarities have been observed between the Iberomaurusian Mechta-Afalou burials and European Cro-Magnon remains. The Iberomaurusian industry in Morocco was succeeded by the Capsian culture.

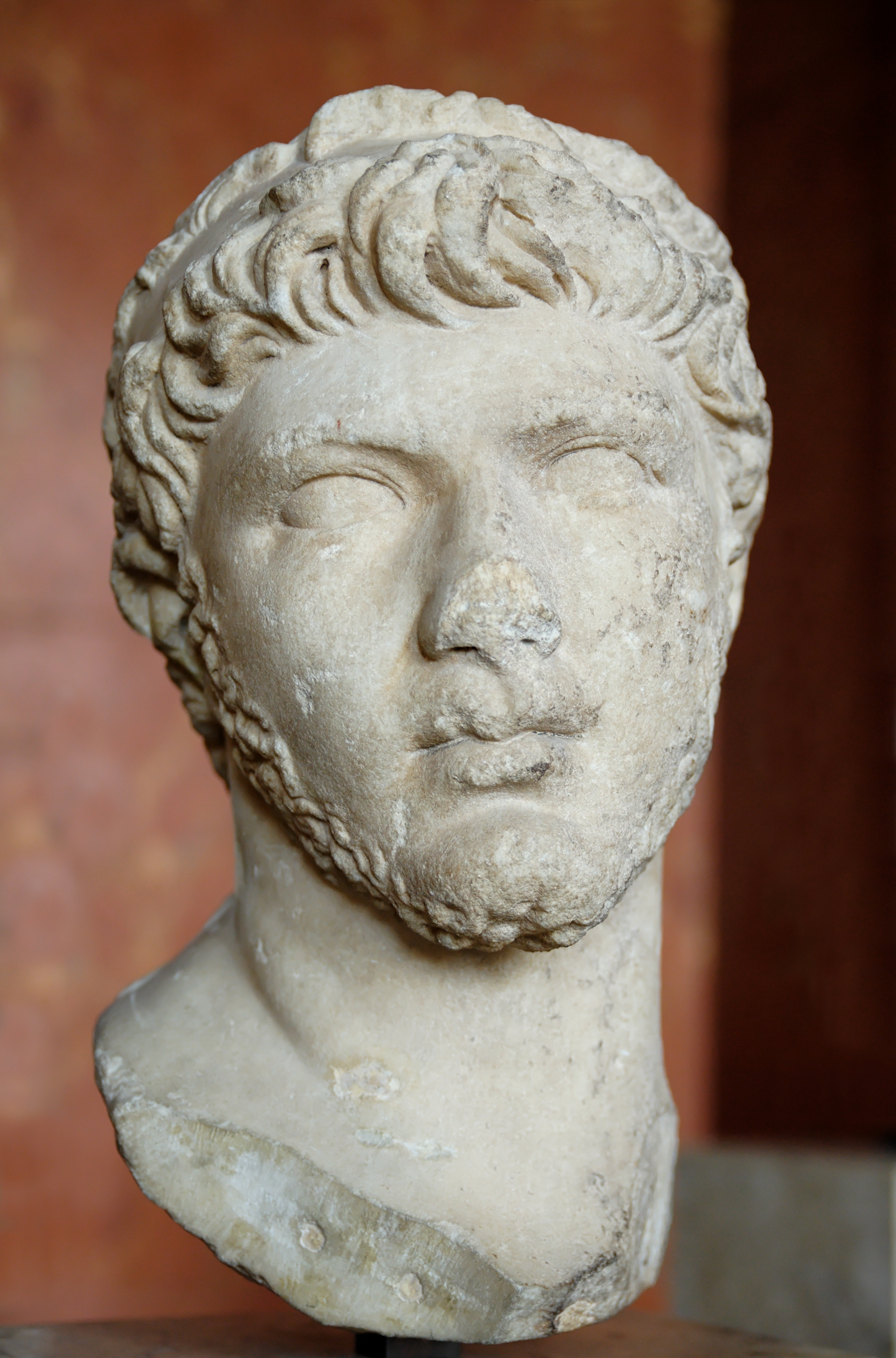
Berber Roman King Ptolemy of Mauretania.

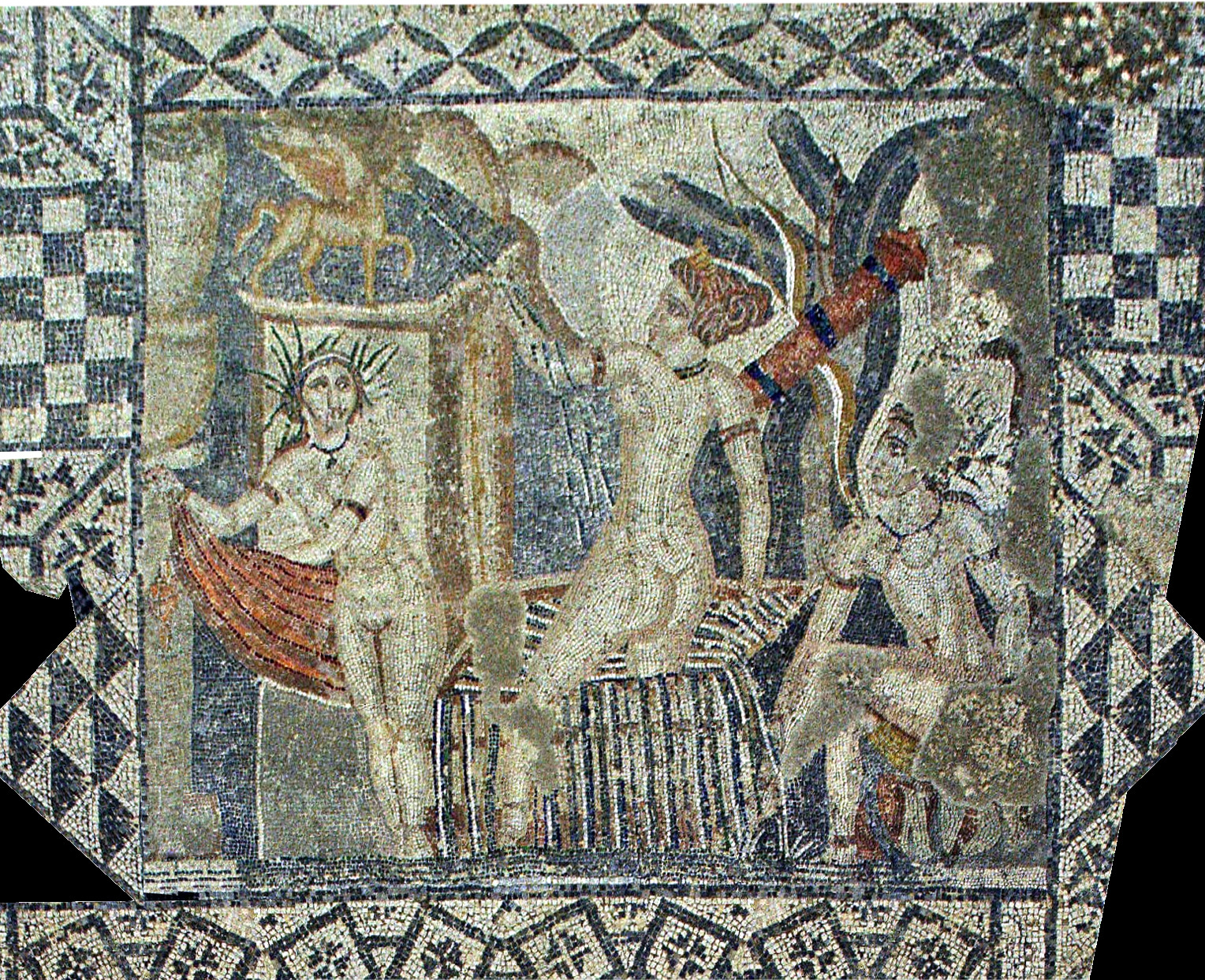
Mosaic of Diana in Volubilis.

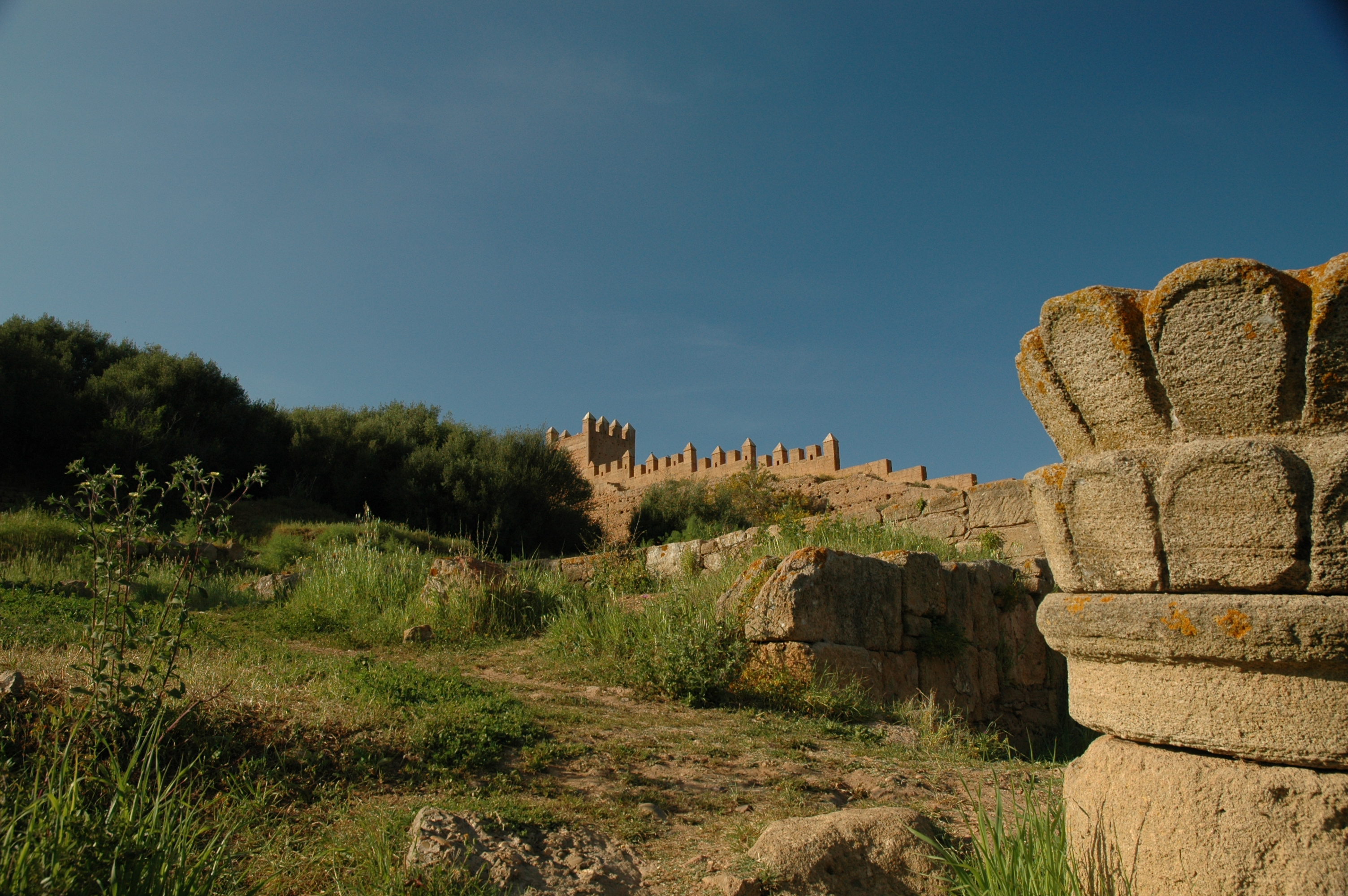
Ruins of Chellah, Salé.

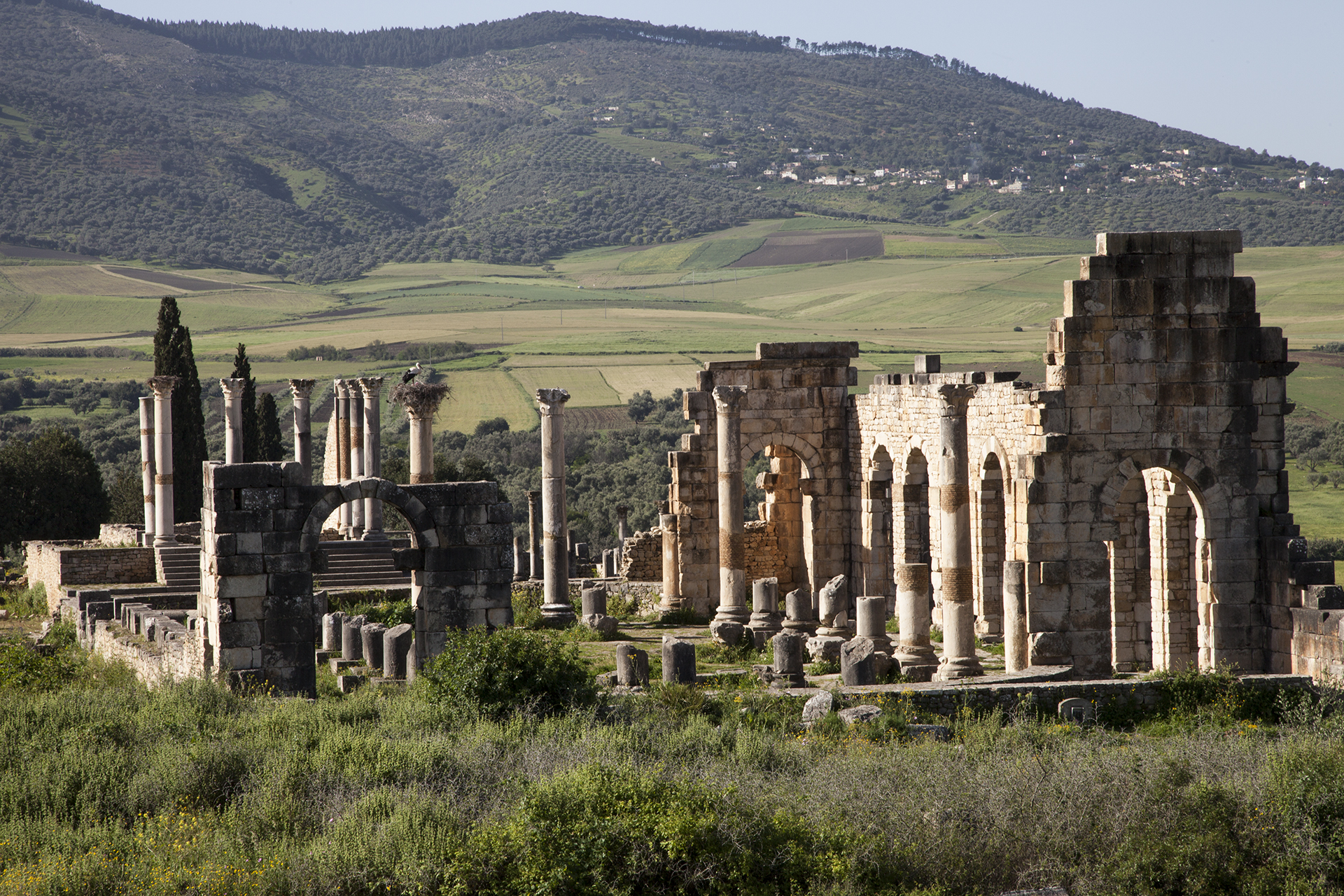
Volubilis ruins.

North Africa and Morocco were slowly drawn into the wider emerging Mediterranean world by the West Asian Semitic Phoenicians, who established trading colonies and settlements in the early Classical period. Mogador was a Phoenician colony as early as the early 6th century BC.

Morocco later became part of a Phoenocian North African and Iberian empire headquartered in Carthage. The earliest known independent Moroccan state was the Berber kingdom of Mauretania under king Bocchus I. This kingdom in northern Morocco, not to be confused with the present state of Mauritania, dates at least to 110 BC.

The Roman Empire controlled this region from the 1st century BC, naming it Mauretania Tingitana. Christianity was introduced in the 2nd century AD and gained converts in the Roman towns, among slaves and some Berber farmers.

In the 5th century AD, as the Roman Empire declined, the region was invaded from the north first by the Germanic Vandals and then by the Visigoths. In the 6th century AD, northern Morocco was nominally part of the East Roman, or Byzantine Empire. Throughout this time, the Berber inhabitants in the high mountains of the interior of Morocco remained unsubdued.

== History ==
=== Early Arab era ===
In 670 AD, the first Arab conquest of the North African coastal plain took place under Uqba ibn Nafi, a general serving under the Umayyads of Damascus. The Umayyad Muslims brought their language, their system of government, and Islam to Morocco. Many of the Berbers slowly converted to Islam, mostly after Arab rule had receded. The first independent Berber state in the area of modern Morocco was the Kingdom of Nekor, an emirate in the Rif Mountains. It was founded by Salih I ibn Mansur in 710, as a client state to the Rashidun Caliphate. After the outbreak of the Great Berber Revolt in 739, the Berbers formed other independent states such as the Miknasa of Sijilmasa and the Barghawata.

Idris ibn Abdallah had fled to Morocco after the Abbasids' massacre of his tribe in Iraq. He convinced the Awraba Berber tribes to break their allegiance to the distant Abbasid caliphs in Baghdad and he founded the Idrisid Dynasty in 788. The Idrisids established Fes as their capital and Morocco became a centre of Muslim learning and a major regional power. The Idrissids were ousted in 927 by the Fatimid Caliphate and their Miknasa allies. After Miknasa broke off relations with the Fatimids in 932, they were removed from power by the Maghrawa of Sijilmasa in 980.

=== Berber dynasties ===
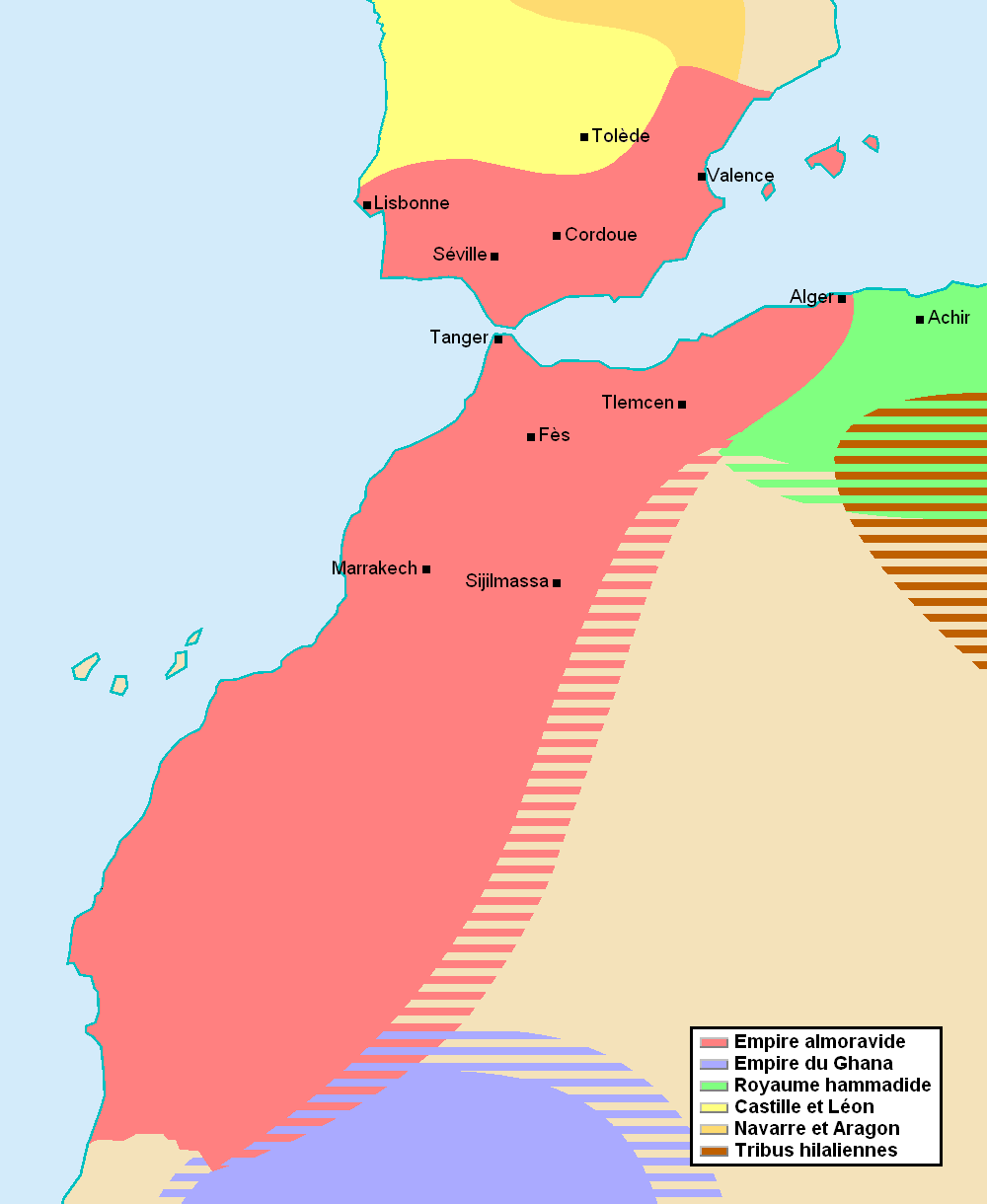
The Almoravid realm at its greatest extent, c. 1120

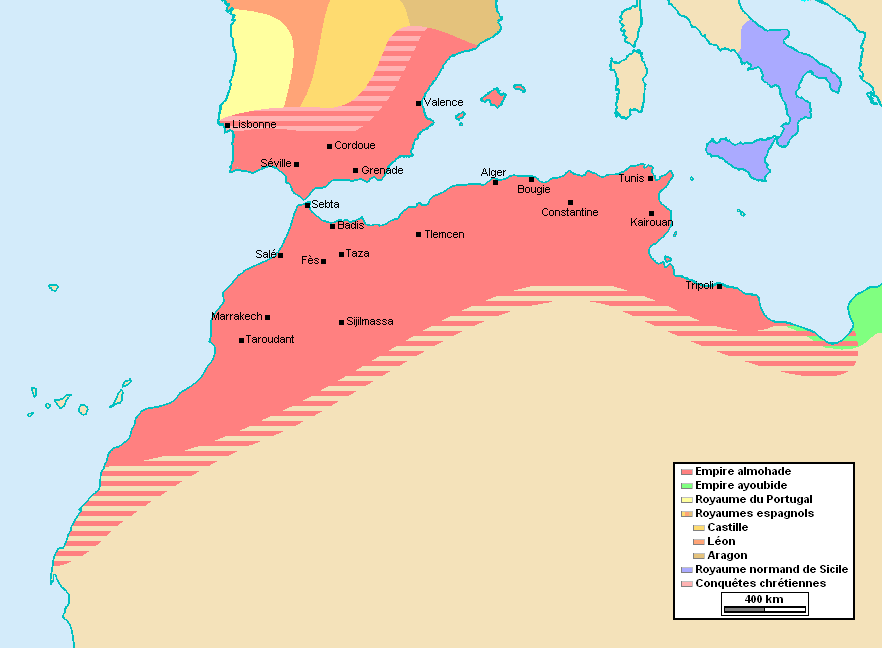
The Almohad realm at its greatest extent, c. 1212

From the 11th century onwards, a series of powerful Berber dynasties arose. Under the Almoravid dynasty and the Almohad dynasty dominated the Maghreb, much of present-day Spain and Portugal, and the western Mediterranean region. In the 13th and 14th centuries the Merinids held power in Morocco and strove to replicate the successes of the Almohads by military campaigns in Algeria and Iberia. They were followed by the Wattasids. In the 15th century, the Reconquista ended Muslim rule in central and southern Iberia and many Muslims and Jews fled to Morocco. Portuguese efforts to control the Atlantic coast in the 15th century did not greatly affect the interior of Morocco. According to Elizabeth Allo Isichei, "In 1520, there was a famine in Morocco so terrible that for a long time other events were dated by it. It has been suggested that the population of Morocco fell from 5 to under 3 million between the early sixteenth and nineteenth centuries."

=== Arab dynasties ===
In 1549, the region fell to successive Arab dynasties claiming descent from the Islamic prophet, Muhammad: first the Saadi dynasty who ruled from 1549 to 1659, and then the Alaouite dynasty, who remained in power since the 17th century.

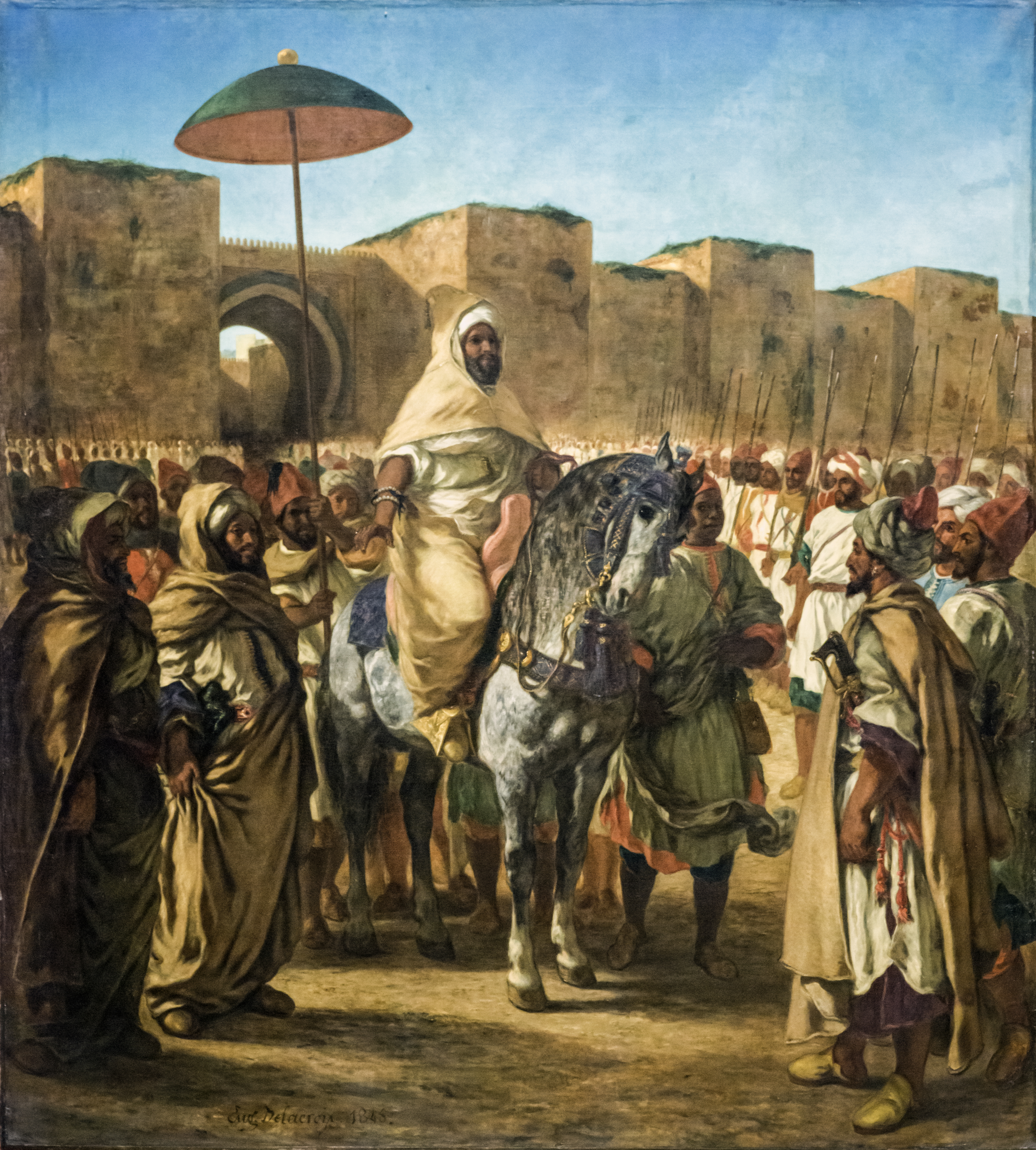
The Sultan Abderrahmane of Morocco, by Eugène Delacroix.

Under the Saadi Dynasty, the country repulsed Ottoman incursions and a Portuguese invasion at the battle of Ksar el Kebir in 1578. The reign of Ahmad al-Mansur brought new wealth and prestige to the Sultanate, and a large expedition to West Africa inflicted a crushing defeat on the Songhay Empire in 1591. However, managing the territories across the Sahara proved too difficult. After the death of al-Mansur the country was divided among his sons.

In 1666 Morocco was reunited by the Alaouite Dynasty, who have been the ruling house of Morocco ever since. Morocco was facing aggression from Spain and the Ottoman Empire lies pressing westward. The Alaouites succeeded in stabilizing their position, and while the kingdom was smaller than previous ones in the region, it remained quite wealthy. Against the opposition of local tribes Ismail Ibn Sharif (1672–1727) began to create a unified state. With his Jaysh d'Ahl al-Rif (the Riffian Army) he seized Tangier from the English in 1684 and drove the Spanish from Larache in 1689.

Morocco was the first nation to recognize the fledgling United States as an independent nation in 1777. In the beginning of the American Revolution, American merchant ships in the Atlantic Ocean were subject to attack by the Barbary pirates. On 20 December 1777, Morocco's Sultan Mohammed III declared that American merchant ships would be under the protection of the sultanate and could thus enjoy safe passage. The Moroccan-American Treaty of Friendship, signed in 1786, stands as the U.S.'s oldest non-broken friendship treaty.

== Arab influx ==
There have been several waves of Arab migration to Morocco. The most significant wave was the migration of Banu Hilal, Banu Sulaym and Maqil in the 11th century. They moved to the region of present-day Morocco in the 12th century when the Almohad ruler Abd al-Mu'min transferred them there in large numbers and settled them in the Atlantic plains, in a region previously inhabited by the Barghawata tribal group. This region was largely destroyed and depopulated by the Almoravids, then depopulated again by the Almohads in 1149–1150 and 1197–1198, before replacing the depopulated area with Arab Bedouin migrants. The Almohads helped the Arab tribes to pass the barriers of Atlas mountains, and accelerated their expansion to Morocco to complete the nomadic Bedouin predominance over the lowlands of the Maghreb as far as the Atlantic coastal plains. The appearance of the Arabs added to the complexity of the ethnic population of Morocco and introduced a significant non-Berber element. They increasingly played an important role in the politics of the Almohad Empire. The Almohad ruler Abd al-Mu'min expected opposition from the Masmuda to whom he was a stranger, so he gained Arab support to secure the succession of his son. With the decline of the Almohad army, the Arab Bedouins became the most powerful force in the Moroccan plains, and no ruler could have held authority there without their support.

Under the Marinids, the Arabs grew in importance in Morocco. Due to the lack of Zenata supporters, they welcomed the support of Arab nomads who already began to penetrate into the country under the Almohads. The Zenata were heavily assimilated into Arab culture and the Marinid Makhzan (government) composed of both Arabs and Zenata. This led to the expansion of Arab tribes into Morocco where they settled in the plains, and many Berber groups were Arabized. Under the Marinids, Arabic became both the common and official language. This demographic process heavily implied gene flow and remodeled the genetic structure.

== Genetic evidence ==
A genetic study published in January 2012 stated that the indigenous North West African ancestry appears most closely related to populations outside of Africa but "divergence between Moroccan people and Near Eastern/Europeans likely precedes the Holocene (>12,000 ya) and The Paleolithic (>40.000BC)."

According to a 2000 article in European Journal of Human Genetics, Moroccans from North-Western Africa, although still with many differences, are genetically closer to Southern Europeans than to Sub-Saharan Africans of Bantu ethnicity.

There is a substantial contribution of Sub-Saharan African DNA in about a third of Moroccan people, with the most West Eurasian Berbers showing contributions of 1-10% Sub-Saharan African DNA on average. Non Berber populations showed substantially more Sub-Saharan African DNA contributions (up to 55%). When it comes to Sub-Saharan African contributions, differences among Berber populations were not significant. Coudray et al. (2009) and Hernández et al. (2015) showed an increased representation of Sub-Saharan African mtDNA haplogroups in Figuig Berbers (i.e., high prevalence of L-derived lineages).

The different loci studied revealed close similarity between the Berbers and other North African groups, mainly with Moroccan Arabic-speakers, which is in accord with the hypothesis that the current Moroccan population has a strong Berber background. On the other hand, various studies have also shown that the Moroccan population is genetically heterogenous and diverse, and that even Berbers themselves enclose genetically diverse groups. Various population genetics studies along with historians such as Gabriel Camps and Charles-André Julien lend support to the idea that the bulk of the gene pool of modern Northwest Africans, irrespective of linguistic group, is of Neolithic origin. Various more recent studies opposed this and came to the conclusion that the J-M267 chromosome pool is derived not only from early Neolithic dispersions but to a much greater extent from recent expansions of Arab tribes from the Arabian Peninsula, which implied gene flow and remodeled the genetic structure of the Maghreb.

David Schoenbrun, Christopher Ehret, A Brandt and Shomarka Keita (2025) have highlighted the problematic categorisation of genetic haplogroups characterised as ‘African’ and ‘Eurasian' in North African genome studies. In reference to the van de Loosdrecht et al. 2018 study on the epipalaeolithic Taforalt remains from Morocco, which identified the EM35 (primarily EM78) common in north-eastern Africa but characterised the mtDNA (female lineage haplogroups) of U6 and M1 as 'Eurasian', the authors questioned this classification of these maternal haplogroups despite their localised and long-established presence in ancient African populations. In their view, identifying a range of African populations may still remain an issue “since the idea of ‘African’ still gets stereotyped or restricted. (Accepting the southwestern Asian/Levantine geographical continuity with Africa eliminates a conceptual barrier related to racio-typological thinking permitting an Africasian construct analogous to Eurasian.)”.

== Moroccan Y-DNA chromosome ==
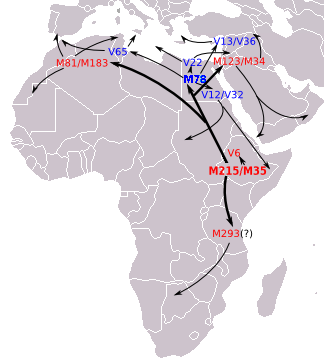
Origin and dispersal of E-M215 and its subclades from East Africa.

=== E-M81 ===
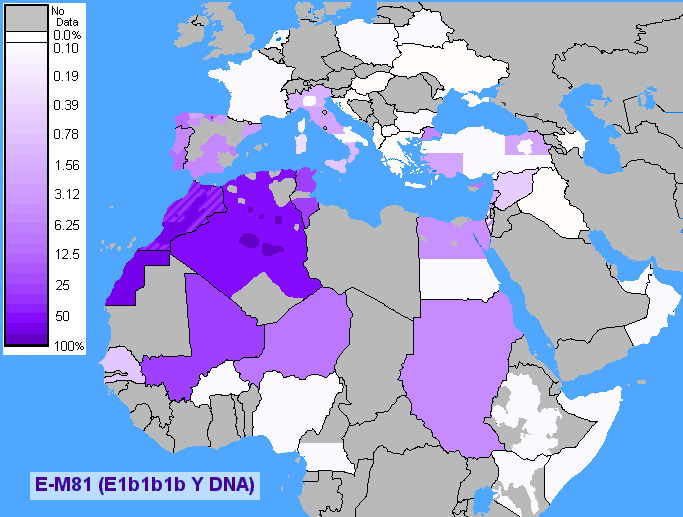
Distribution of Y haplotype E-M81 E1b1b1b in North Africa, West Asia and Europe.

E1b1b1b1 (E-M81), formerly E1b1b1b, E3b1b, and E3b2, is the most common Y chromosome haplogroup in Morocco, dominated by its subclade E-M183. It is thought to have originated in North Africa 14,200 years ago.

Its parent clade E1b1b (E-M215) is believed to have first appeared in the Horn of Africa about 42,600 years ago. Its dominant subclade E-M35 is thought to have emerged in East-Africa about 22,400 years ago, and would have later dispersed into North Africa and from there into West Asia. All major sub-branches of E-M35 are thought to have originated in the same general area as the parent clade: in North Africa, Horn of Africa, or nearby areas of the Near East. Some branches of E-M35 left Africa many thousands of years ago. For example, Battaglia et al. (2008) estimated that E-M78 (called E1b1b1a1 in that paper) has been in Europe longer than 10,000 years.

This haplogroup reaches a mean frequency of 85% in North Africa. It decreases in frequency from approximately 80% or more in some Moroccan Berber populations, including Saharawis, to approximately 28% to the east of this range in Egypt.

Due to the clade's prevalence among these Berber groups and others such as Mozabites, Riffians, Chleuhs, Middle Atlas and Kabyle, it is sometimes referred to as a genetic Berber marker.

This phylogenetic tree of The Berber haplogroup subclades is based on the YCC 2008 tree and subsequent published research as summarized by ISOGG.

- E1b1b1b (L19, V257)
  - E1b1b1b1 (M81)
    - E1b1b1b1a (M107) Underhill et al. (2000).
    - E1b1b1b1b (M183) This clade is extremely dominant within E-M81. In fact, while Karafet et al. (2008) continues to describe this as a sub-clade of E-M81, and ISOGG defers to Karafet et al., all data seems to imply that it should actually be considered phylogenetically equivalent to M81.
      - E1b1b1b1b1 (M165) Underhill et al. (2000).
      - E1b1b1b1b2 (L351) Found in two related participants in The E-M35 Phylogeny Project.

Average North African Moroccan Berbers have frequencies of E3b3 in the +80%. Alvarez et al. (2009) study shows a frequency of E3b1b of 28/33 or 84.8% in Berbers from Marrakesh. With the rest of the frequencies being 1/33=3% E3a*, 1/33=3% E3b*, 1/33 or 3% E3b1a, and 1/33 or 3% E3b1c.

E1b1b (M81) are Proto-Berber marker E1b1b1b1a1 (M107) A reduced Proto-Berber lineage in Mali.

=== J-P209 ===
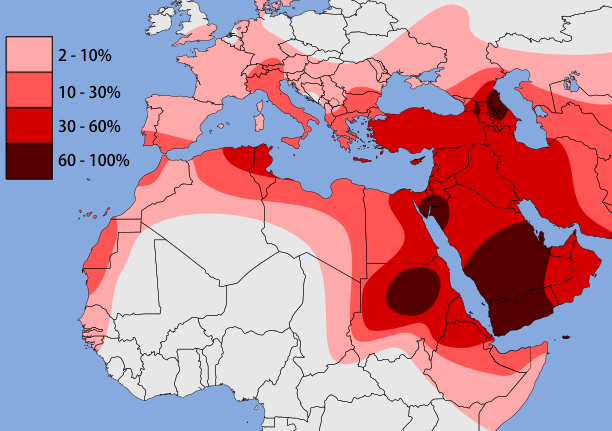
Haplogroup J (Y-DNA) distribution

Haplogroup J-P209 is the second most common Y chromosome in Morocco, dominated by its subclade J-M267 (J1). It is believed to have arisen roughly 31,700 years ago in Southwest Asia (31,700±12,800 years ago according to Semino et al. 2004). Its highest frequency of 30%–62.5% has been observed in Muslim Arab populations in the Middle East.

Haplogroup J-P209 is found in greatest concentration in Southwestern Arabian Peninsula. haplogroup J-P209 has a significant presence in North Africa, being the second most frequent haplogroup in the Maghreb. A study from 2021 has shown that the highest frequency of the Middle Eastern component ever observed in North Africa so far was observed in the Arabs of Wesletia in Tunisia, who had a Middle Eastern component frequency of 71.8%. J-P209 has been found in frequencies of 35% in Algeria, 34% in Tunisia and 20% in Egypt (Semino et al. 2004). In Morocco, J-M267 has been found in frequencies of 26.4%, 31.5%, and 20.4%.

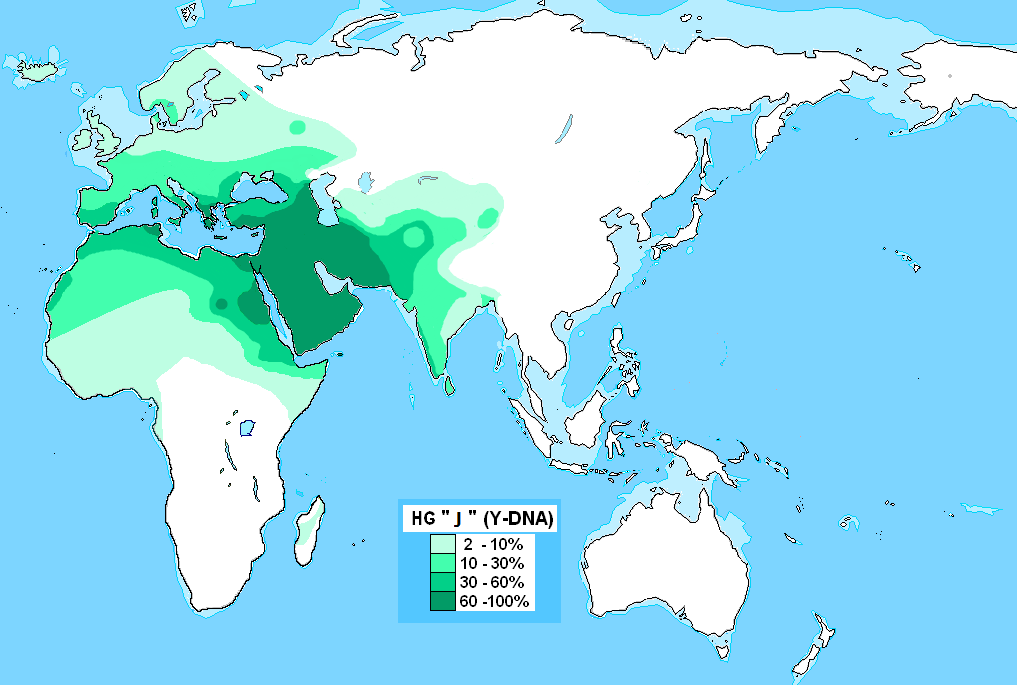
Distribution of Haplogroup J (Y-DNA)

A recent study found out that the J-M267 chromosome pool in the Maghreb is derived not only from early Neolithic dispersions but to a much greater extent from the Arab migrations to the Maghreb, recent expansions of Arab tribes from the Arabian Peninsula, during which both southern Qahtanite and northern Adnanite Arabs added to the heterogenous Maghrebi ethnic melting pot. This heavily implied gene flow and remodeled the genetic structure of the Maghreb, rather than being a mere cultural replacement as claimed by older studies. This increased genetic similarities between North Africans and Middle Easterners.

=== E-M78 ===
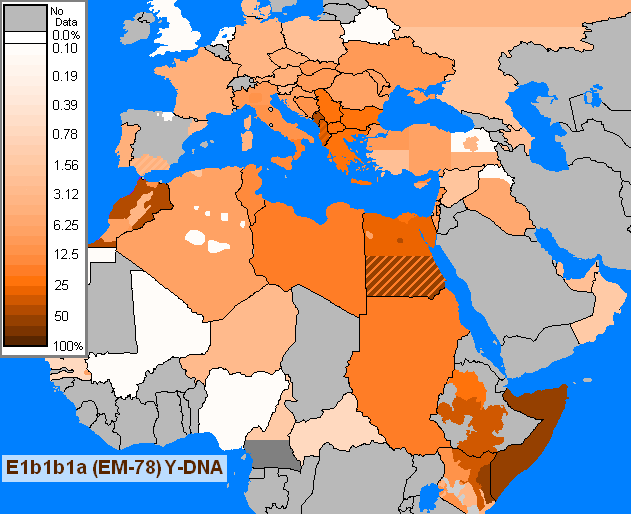
Distribution density of E1b1b1a (E-M78) in select areas of Africa and Eurasia.

The most basal and rare E-M78* paragroup has been found at lower frequencies in Moroccan Arabs. The sub-clade E-V65 is found in high levels in the Maghreb regions of far northern Africa. Cruciani et al. (2007) report levels of about 20% amongst Libyan Arab lineages, and about 30% amongst Moroccan Arabs. It appears to be less common amongst Berbers, but still present in levels of >10%. The authors suggest a North African origin for this lineage. In Europe, only a few individuals were found in Italy and Greece.

Capelli et al. (2009) studied the beta cluster in Europe. They found small amounts in Southern Italy, but also traces in Cantabria, Portugal and Galicia, with Cantabria having the highest level in Europe in their study, at 3.1% (5 out of 161 people).

Other frequencies of E1b1b1a1c (E-V22) is reported by Cruciani et al. (2007) include Moroccan Arabs (7.27%, 55 people) and Moroccan Jews (8%, 50 people).

=== Other haplogroups ===
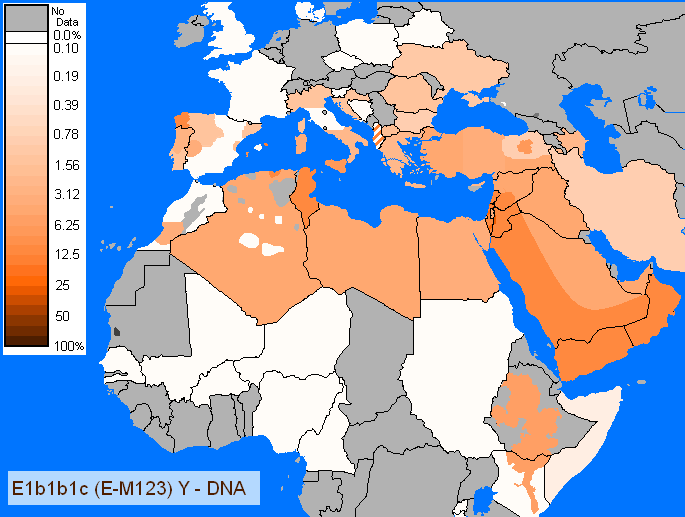
Haplogroup E-M123 (Y-DNA) Map.

Concerning E-M123 without checking for the E-M34 SNP is found at small frequencies in Morocco A Low regional percentages for E-M123 was reported in Moroccan Berbers around 3%. E-M123 is also known as E1b1b1b2a (ISOGG 2012).

Eurasian haplogroups such as Haplogroup J and Haplogroup R1 have also been observed at very minimal frequencies. A thorough study by Cruciani et al. (2004) which analyzed populations from Morocco concludes that the North African pattern of Y-chromosomal variation (including both J1 and R1b haplogroups) is largely of Neolithic origin, which suggests that the Neolithic transition in this part of the world was accompanied by demic diffusion of Berber-speaking pastoralists from the Algerian Desert into Eastern Morocco, although later papers have suggested that this date could have been as long as ten thousand years ago, with the transition from the Oranian to the Capsian culture in North Africa.

Haplogroups G and T are rarely found in Morocco, In 147 samples taken in Morocco, 1% were found to be G.

In another study 1% of 312 samples in Morocco were G.

Another study gathered samples only from hamlets in Morocco's Azgour Valley, where none of 33 samples were determined G. These hamlets were selected because they were felt to be typically Berber in composition.

A study of 20 Moroccan Jews found 30% were G. The tested men were then apparently living in Israel. Another study of Jewish men found 19.3% of 83 Jewish men from Morocco belonged to haplogroup G. over G Moroccan samples are Likely Positive on the SNP G2a2b Haplogroup, it has been identified in Neolithic human remains in Europe dating between 5000 and 3000BC. Furthermore, the majority of all the male skeletons from the European Neolithic period have so far yielded Y-DNA belonging to this haplogroup like the mummified remains of Ötzi the Iceman, The National Geographic Society places haplogroup G origins in the Middle East 30,000 years ago and presumes that people carrying the haplogroup took part in the spread of the Neolithic into Africa and then Europe Two percent of Arab Moroccans and 0% to 8% of Berber Moroccans of Asni Oasis were likewise found to be G.

Haplogroup T is found amongst central Berbers of Asni Oasis near the Algerian frontiers at 1,9% and observed in Moroccan Jews at 4%.

The most basal and rare E1a* paragroup has been found at lower frequencies in samples obtained from Moroccan Berbers, and Sahrawis. dated around 45.000BC Linked to Back-Eurasian Migration from the Near East into North Africa along together with E1b1b during the Paleolithic times.

=== Moroccan Y-DNA Haplogroups ===
Population	n	A/B	E-M33	E-V38	E-M35*	E-M78	E-M81	E-M123	G	J	R	Reference
Morocco	760	0.9	2.7	3.2	4.2	6.8	67.3	0.6	0.6	7.6	4.4	Bekada et al. 2013
Morocco	87	—	—	9.2	—	5.7	52.8	—	—	26.4	—	Fadhlaoui-Zid et al. 2013
Morocco	221	—	1.8	4.5	4	6.8	65	—	—	9	4	Fregel et al. 2009
Morocco	51	4	6	—	6	6	55	—	—	20	4	Onofri et al. 2008
Morocco	176	—	—	6.3	5.1	6.3	63.6	—	—	13.6	2.8	Bosch et al. 2001
Arabs (Morocco)	49	—	—	—	—	42.9	32.6	—	—	20.4	—	Semino et al. 2004
Arabs (Morocco)	44	—	—	6.8	2.2	11.3	52.2	—	—	15.9	6.8	Bosch et al. 2001
Arabs (Morocco)	54	—	—	—	—	38.9	31.5	—	—	—	—	Cruciani et al. 2004
Berbers (Morocco)	64	—	—	—	—	10.9	68.7	—	—	6.3	—	Semino et al. 2004
Berbers (Marrakesh)	29	—	—	—	3.4	6.9	72.4	—	—	—	—	Cruciani et al. 2004
Berbers (Middle Atlas)	69	—	—	—	—	10.1	71	—	4.3	5.8	—	Cruciani et al. 2004
Berbers (Southern Morocco)	40	—	—	2.5	7.5	12.5	65	—	—	10	—	Bosch et al. 2001
Berbers (North Central)	63	—	3.1	9.5	7.9	1.5	65	—	—	11.1	—	Bosch et al. 2001
Berbers (Amizmiz)	33	3	—	3	3	3	84.8	3	—	—	—	Alvarez et al. 2009
Berbers (Asni)	54	—	—	—	1.9	3.7	79.6	—	—	1.9	1.9	Dugoujon et al. (2005)
Berbers (Sidi Bouhria - Beni Znassen)	67	—	—	—	—	1.5	77.6	—	6	1.5	6	Dugoujon et al. (2005)
Berbers (Northern Morocco)	43	—	—	—	—	—	79.1	—	—	—	—	Ahmed Reguig et al. 2014
Berbers (Southern Morocco)	65	—	—	—	—	—	98.5	—	—	—	—	Ahmed Reguig et al. 2014
Berbers (Central Morocco)	187	—	—	—	—	—	89.8	—	—	—	—	Ahmed Reguig et al. 2014
Moroccan Sahrawi	189	0.5	5.2	6.8	—	—	55.5	11.1	—	13.2	7.2	Bekada et al. 2013
Moroccan Sahrawi	89	—	8.9	11.2	—	—	59.5	—	—	20.2	—	Fregel et al. 2009
Moroccan Sahrawi	29	—	3.4	3.4	—	—	75.8	—	—	17.2	—	Bosch et al. 2001
Moroccan Jews	19	—	—	—	21.1	—	—	—	26.3	31.5	10.5	Francalacci et al. 2008

== Haplogroup distributions in Moroccan Populations ==
The major components of Y-DNA haplogroups present in Moroccan Berbers (E3b; 94%) are shared with European and neighboring North African and Near Eastern populations. Minor share of haplogroups also include those related to North West Africans (E1a, A1a; 1%), Near Easterners (J, G, T; 2,4%), Sub Saharans Africans (E3a; 1,7%) and Europeans (R1b, I1; 2%) affinity.

Some of the major percentages identified were:

- E1b1b: 56% - Typical of Afroasiatic-speaking populations.
- J-P209: 20.4% (Semino et al. 2004) - Typical of populations of the Arabian peninsula, the Levant and Caucasus, with a moderate distribution in Southeast Europe, North Africa, the Horn of Africa, Central Asia and South Asia.
- R1b: 0.8% to 6.8% (Bosch 2001) - Typical of Western Europeans, some West Asian peoples, the Sudanese Fulani and the Chadic-speaking peoples of Central Africa, and some Central Asian peoples (such as the Bashkirs, Turkmen and Uyghurs).
- G: 0.4% - Typical of people from the Caucasus, and to a lesser extent the Middle East.
- E1a: 0.5% - Rare haplogroup that has been found amongst Moroccan Berbers, Sahrawis, Southern Europeans, and some Chadic speakers in the Sahel.
- E1b1a: 1.7% - Typical of Niger-Congo-speaking populations.
- T: 0.4% - Widely distributed around West Eurasia.
- I: 0.4% - It can be found in the majority of present-day European populations, with peaks in Northern and South-Eastern Europe. Haplogroup I1 Y-chromosomes have also been found among some populations of the Near East, the Caucasus, Northeast Africa and Central Siberia.

== Berber Genetic Identity of Moroccans ==
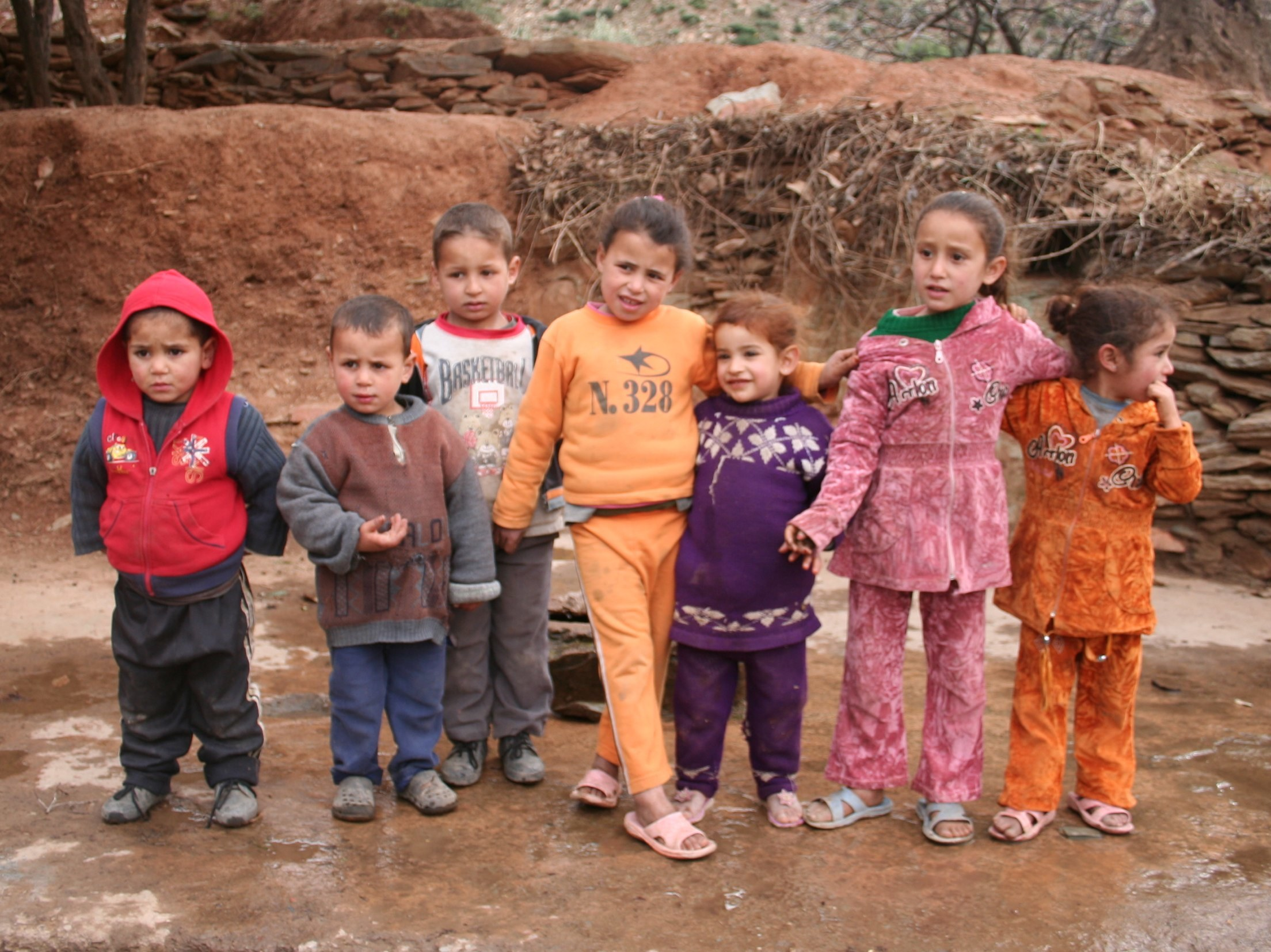
Berber children in Morocco.

The prehistoric populations of Morocco, who were ancestral to Berbers, were related to the wider group of Paleo-Mediterranean peoples. The Afroasiatic family probably originated during the Mesolithic period, perhaps in the context of the Capsian culture. DNA analysis has found commonalities between Berber Moroccan populations and those of the Sami people of Scandinavia showing a link dating from around 9,000 years ago.

Around 5000 BC, the populations of North Africa were primarily descended from the makers of the Iberomaurusian and Capsian cultures, with a more recent intrusion associated with the Neolithic Revolution. The proto-Berber tribes evolved from these prehistoric communities during the Late Bronze to Early Iron Age.

== Genetic Prehistoric Expansions ==
DNA evidence suggests that during the Last Glacial Maximum, a period between 25,000 and 19,000 years ago, large ice sheets over a kilometer thick covered much of Northern Europe, making the region uninhabitable to humans. It is believed that human populations retreated south to warmer regions near the Mediterranean. Refugees during this period are believed to have been in Iberia, the Balkans and Italy and therefore was some gene flow from North Africa into Southern Europe.

After the glacial maximum, when the European climate warmed up, the refuges are thought to have been the source from which Europe was repopulated. Prehistoric African lineages that had been introduced into Iberia as refugees would have then dispersed all over Europe with the Northward expansion of humans. This could explain the presence of genetic lineages in Eastern Europe and as far north as Russia, that appear to have prehistoric links to Northwest Africa, mainly Morocco (see mtDNA). The expansion of human populations from Iberian refuges is also believed to have moved back to Morocco and Northwest Africa.

=== Neolithic to the end of the prehistoric ===
The change from hunting and gathering to agriculture during the Neolithic Revolution was a watershed in world history. The societies that first made the change to agriculture are believed to have lived in North Africa and Middle East around 10,000 BCE. Agriculture was introduced into Europe by migrating farmers from the Middle East. According to the demic diffusion model, these Middle Eastern farmers either replaced or interbred with the local hunter-gather populations that had been living in Europe since the "out of Africa" migration.

It has been suggested that the first Middle Eastern farmers had North African influences mainly from the Capsian culture. There have been suggestions that some genetic lineages found in the Middle East arrived there during this period. The first Agricultural societies in the Middle East are generally thought to have emerged from the Natufian Culture, which existed in Palestine from 12,000 BCE-10,000 BCE. An important migration from North-West Africa occurred by the Ibero-Maurisians from Morocco across the Sinai appears to have occurred before the formation of the Natufian.

== Genetic continuity in Morocco ==
In 2013, skeletons belonging to the makers of the Epipaleolithic Iberomaurusian culture, which were excavated at the prehistoric sites of Taforalt and Afalou, were analyzed for ancient DNA. All of the specimens belonged to maternal clades associated with either North Africa or the northern and southern Mediterranean littoral, indicating gene flow between these areas since the Epipaleolithic. The ancient Taforalt individuals carried the Y-DNA haplogroup E1b1b and the mtDNA haplogroups U6, H, JT and V, which points to population continuity in the region dating from the Iberomaurusian period.

According to a study by Fadhlaoui-Zid in 2004, this pattern suggests that the Arabization of the area was mainly a cultural process, rather than a demographic replacement of the Berber populations that inhabited the region where the Arabic expansion took place. However, the results of a more recent study from 2017 suggested that the Arab migration to the Maghreb was mainly a demographic process that implied gene flow and remodeled the genetic structure, rather than a mere cultural replacement as suggested previously by historical records.

Ancient DNA from ancient Palaeolithic and Neolithic Moroccans, have revealed retention of these genetic components in modern populations.

== Moroccan Mitochondrial mtDNA ==
The Moroccan mitochondrial pool is essentially Berber in its structure, characterized by an "overall high frequency of Western Eurasian haplogroups" Represented by the Post-last glacial maximum expansion from Iberia to North Africa revealed by fine characterization of mtDNA HV haplogroup in Morocco is Estimated around 36% to 60%, a somehow lower frequency of sub-Saharan L lineages, and a significant (but differential) presence of North African haplogroups U6 and M1". And according to Cherni et al. 2008 "the post-Last glacial maximum expansion originating in Iberia not only led to the resettlement of Europe but also of North Africa".

Eurasian mtDNA (maternal) sequences, were detected at frequencies of 96% in Moroccan Berbers, 82% in Algerian Berbers and 78% in non-Berber Moroccans, compared with only 4% in a Senegalese population.

Until recently, some papers suggested that the distribution of the main L haplogroups in Morocco was mainly due to trans-Saharan slave trade. However, in September 2010, a thorough study on Berber mtDNA by Sabeh Frigi concluded that some haplogroups such as L3* were much older and introduced by an ancient African gene flow around 20,000 years ago, while others such as L2a and L3b were having more recent origins.

Moroccan Northern Berbers have only 3% to 1% of SSA mtDNA, This north-south gradient in the sub-Saharan contribution to the gene pool is supported by Esteban et al., for the rest of mtDNA lineages mostly are Caucasian/West Eurasian, while Moroccan Arabs have more elevated SSA maternal admixture at around 21% to 36% Via L-mtDNA sequences, Highest frequencies of L-mtDNA is Reported to Moroccan Arabs of The Surrounding area of El jadida at 36% and this is largely ascribed to the slave trade.

In a mitochondrial DNA study, the sample set of 89 Moroccans were seen to be genetically differentiated from the 10 other Mediterranean populations included.

Frequencies (> 1%) of L-mtDNA

Country	Ethnic Group	Number tested	Reference	L-mtDNA%
Morocco	Moroccan (Jews)	149	Behar et al. (2008)	1.34%
Morocco	Moroccan Northern (Berbers)	124	Esteban et al. (2004)	1%
Morocco	Moroccan (Arabs)	81	Harich et al. (2010)	36%
Morocco	Moroccan Arabs	56	Turchi et al. (2009)	25.00%
Morocco	Moroccan Southern (Berbers)	64	Turchi et al. (2009)	26.00%

== See also ==
- Demographics of Morocco
- Genetic history of North Africa
- Y-DNA haplogroups in populations of North Africa
- Genetic history of the Middle East
- Genetic studies on Arabs
