= Goins (surname) =

- Map of Goins families, 1790-1830, with racial census data included.
- Language: American English

Origin
- Languages: English, Irish, German, French, speculated Portuguese, or Kimbundu
- Meaning: "blacksmith" from Gowing (English) or Gowan (Irish). "good" from Göing (German), a variant of “Göding,” formed with the elements god, got, or gōd. Other speculated etymologies.

Other names
- Variant forms: Goines, Gowan, Gowen, Gowin, Goans, Goan, Goings, Guynes, Gunn

Goins (/ˈɡoʊ.ɪns/ GO-ins) is a polygenetic surname of multiple etymological origins, including English, Irish, German, and French, with additional speculated links to Portuguese or Kimbundu. It is most prevalent in the United States. The surname has historically been associated with various racial isolate communities along the Eastern Seaboard, and appears in early records of free people of color. Some individuals bearing the surname are also recorded on the Dawes Rolls, Philip Goins, a free African-American descendant of Mihill Gowen, married into the Choctaw people.

Due to its varied origins, the Goins surname does not necessarily indicate a shared genealogy, and many of its bearers do not always descend from the same lineage, racial isolates, or Native Americans, though it has frequently been noted in academic literature for its purported associations with such populations. Goins families associated with the Melungeons have been identified through genealogical and genetic research in the 21st century as being of free African American descent rather than Native American, with some lineages now proven to trace patrilineally to John Graweere, also known as John Gowen, one of the First Africans in Virginia.

Common variants of Goins include but are not necessarily limited to, Goings, Going, Goines, Gowan, Gowen, Gowin, Goans, Goan, Guyne, Guynes, and Gunn.

== Etymology ==
=== British Isles ===
In English contexts Goins is considered as having originated as a variant of the surname “Gowing,” with the addition of a post-medieval excrescent -s. It is also considered an Irish variant of "Gowan". Both variants from the British Isles can be compared to McGowan, an anglicisation of the Irish Mac Gabhann and Scottish Mac Gobhann, both of which mean 'son of (the) smith', implying a Gaelic etymology from "smith," for some instances of the surname Goins.

=== Continental Europe ===
Goins has also been noted in some instances as an altered form of the German surname “Göing,” itself a variant of “Göding,” a pet form of various Germanic personal names formed with the elements god, got, or gōd, meaning “good.” The surname has also been compared to a range of French and German forms, including “Gaines,” “Ganz,” “Gonce,” “Göring,” “Goyne,” “Guarnes,” “Gunn,” and “Guynn,” as well as, more occasionally, to the Portuguese surname “Gomez.” Ethnohistorian Helen C. Rountree, a specialist in the Powhatan and other Algonquian peoples of the Virginia, has noted that the possible Goins surname variant “Gunn” is “genuinely Pamunkey.”

=== Africa ===
Some have proposed connections between certain instances of the surname Goins and anglicized forms of the surname of John Graweere, also recorded as John Gowen, one of the first Africans in Colonial Virginia. Graweere’s name appears in court records in variant forms such as “Geaween” and “Gowen,” and genealogical accounts identify descendant lines bearing surnames familiar to "Goins". Graweere is thought to have originated in the Kingdom of Ndongo, in present-day Angola, where the Kimbundu language is widely spoken.

== Goins Y-DNA Results ==
Y-DNA results from the FamilyTreeDNA Goins DNA Project demonstrate paternal lineage diversity among American individuals bearing the surname, supporting its classification as polygenetic. Participants are distributed across multiple distinct European lineages including Haplogroup R1b and I-M253, associated with populations in Northern Europe, as well as African-associated haplogroups such as E1b1a and A, indicating separate and unrelated paternal origins among families bearing similar surnames.

=== Melungeon Goins ===
Research by Roberta J. Estes, Jack H. Goins, Penny Ferguson, and Jannet Lewis Crain on Melungeon descended populations has identified multiple distinct Goins paternal lineages in colonial Virginia and Appalachia. Among Melungeon associated families, at least three separate Y-DNA Goins lineages have been documented, each tracing to different African progenitors. Two of these lineages fall within haplogroup E1b1a but do not match one another, while a third belongs to haplogroup A. Comparable results in broader DNA project data show individuals bearing the surname Goins clustering in two distinct E1b1a groups as well as haplogroup A, supporting the conclusion that Goins descendants in Appalachia derive from multiple independent African paternal lines.

== Notable individuals ==
Notable people with the surname include:

Athletics

- Boris Goins (born 1967), American sprinter
- Kenny Goins (born 1996), American professional basketball player
- Parker Goins (born 1998), American professional soccer player
- Ryan Goins (born 1988), American professional baseball player

Business

- Michele Goins, American businesswoman and CIO of Juniper Networks

Entertainment

- Glenn Goins (1954–1978), American singer-songwriter and musician
- Herbie Goins (1939–2015), American singer
- Jesse D. Goins, American actor
- Ray Goins (1936–2007), American bluegrass banjoist

Politics

- Jimmy Goins (1948–2015), American politician, former chairman of the Lumbee Tribe of North Carolina
- Tilman Goins (born 1977), American politician

Academia and writing

- Edray Herber Goins (born 1972), African-American mathematician
- Jeff Goins (born 1983), American author, blogger, and speaker

== See also ==
- Goines
- Going (surname)
- Goings
- Gowin
- Gowen
- McGowan
- McGowen
- John Graweere
- Margaret Cornish
- Melungeon
  - Carmel Melungeons
- Lumbee
- Brass Ankles
- Redbones
- Tidewater Creoles
