= Going =

Going may refer to:

- Go (verb)
  - Going- to future, a construction in English grammar
- Going (company)
- Going (horse racing), the condition of a horse racing track surface.
- Going (surname)
- "Going!", a song by KAT-TUN
- Way of going, a reference to the quality of movement in a horse gait
- Going am Wilden Kaiser, an Austrian municipality
- Going (motorcycle taxi), an alternative term for "Okada", a form of motorcycle taxi in Nigeria
- Gogoing, Gao Di-Ping (born April 4, 1997), Chinese retired League of Legends professional player

== See also ==
- Going concern
- Go (disambiguation)
- Gowing
- Gowin
