= Jack's Flight Club =

British travel advice company

Jack's Fight Club
- Industry: Internet
- Founders: Jack Sheldon; Phil Wintermantle
- Area served: Worldwide
- Number of employees: 15
- Website: jacksflightclub.com

Jack's Flight Club is a company co-founded by Jack Sheldon and Phil Wintermantle. It is an email newsletter, online platform, and mobile app focusing on helping subscribers find budget-friendly flights through their alerts. There are over 4,000,000 members in the United Kingdom, Europe, United States and Canada.

== History ==
Jack's Flight Club was established in September 2016 by namesake Jack Sheldon in London. Before establishing Jack's Flight Club, Jack worked for a large data company. He had originally just searched for low airfare rates for the benefit of him, his friends, and his family, and later decided to turn it into a business. He also attributed his interest in searching for flight deals to seeing mistake fares. Jack spent £30 to set up the newsletter. When determining how to monetize Jack's Flight Club, they briefly considered a total paywall, but felt that this was too aggressive. Affiliate links were also considered, but they found them "antithetical" to what the unbiased newsletter stood for.

=== App ===
Jack's Flight Club is available as an app on Android and iOS devices following demand from users. The app proved an easier means by which to send notifications to users due to an issue where the number of emails Jack was sending were creating delivery delays on time-sensitive flight alerts. Jack also states that the inclusion of an app version means that users, if they see a notification during a conversation, may be more likely to share it with whoever they are next to at the time. The app was created using React Native due to the ease by which it would be compatible for both iOS and Android platforms.

== Concept ==
Jack's Flight Club offers members budget-friendly flight deals from the United Kingdom, Ireland, Continental Europe, the United States and Canada. They monitor price fluctuations and highlight cheap fares, whether a result of price drops or a mistake fare. Jack's Flight Club uses in-house tech to search “every fare on every route by every airline”, monitoring them for error fares or flash deals. People can either sign up for a free membership and receive one to two emails per week or pay £48/$60 a year for four times the number of deals. Paid users also receive deals sooner than free users, ranging from hours to a days in advance. The newsletters also contain instructions to assist users in booking on the respective airline's site or a comparison site. In certain circumstances, Jack and his team have helped users on an individual basis if, for example, their flight is cancelled or they are trying to get home to a sick relative. Jack Flight Club's newsletter suggests that people should go for the cheapest deals that they can find as opposed to accumulating air miles with a single airline. Jack claims that this is because in the UK, airline mileage programs such as Amex do not provide much value in terms of sign up bonuses as opposed to the United States.

== Reception ==
Jack's Flight Club has been recommended for its services by publications including refinery29, The Sun, and iNews.

Three months after being established, the subscription service attracted 3,000 users. After doing an "Ask Me Anything" post on Reddit's /r/AmA page that made the front page of Reddit, Jack's Flight Club gained 42,000 more subscribers. Before implementing the freemium payment model, Jack's Flight Club had 65,000 members. Jack's Flight Club had 500,000 subscribers as of May 2018. As of October 2026, Jack's Flight Club has over 4 million subscribers.

Jack Sheldon has written advice articles about cheap flights on websites such as The Guardian, iNews, and The Telegraph.
