= Secret Flying =

Informational website on airline tickets

- Company type: Private
- Founded: 2014; 11 years ago
- Founder: Tarik Allag
- Website: secretflying.com

Secret Flying is an informational website that alerts its users about cheap airline tickets.

== History ==
Secret Flying was founded in 2014 by entrepreneur Tarik Allag. The website was started in response to airlines occasionally making pricing errors. According to Allag, these glitches did not happen in any systematic pattern. He founded the website to keep flyers informed by quickly spotting and publishing them on the site.

The website works by monitoring airline prices. When an abnormally cheap fare is available, it is posted on the site. The website is notable for frequently finding such error fares and publishing them online.

The company previously offered a smartphone application that provided push notifications for flights departing the user's home city. They now provide email alerts of their flight deals.

In September 2018, Forbes cited Secret Flying as one of the "Best Resources For Great Flight and Hotel Deals".

The company has received coverage in various mainstream news due to its nature, such as Forbes, Mirror, The Independent, Vox and The Irish Times among others.

In 2023, the company announced they will not provide results for flights to and from Israel until a two-state solution is in place.
