= Haplogroup E-M2 =

Human Y-chromosome DNA haplogroup

Haplogroup E-M2 (former E3a / E1b1a)
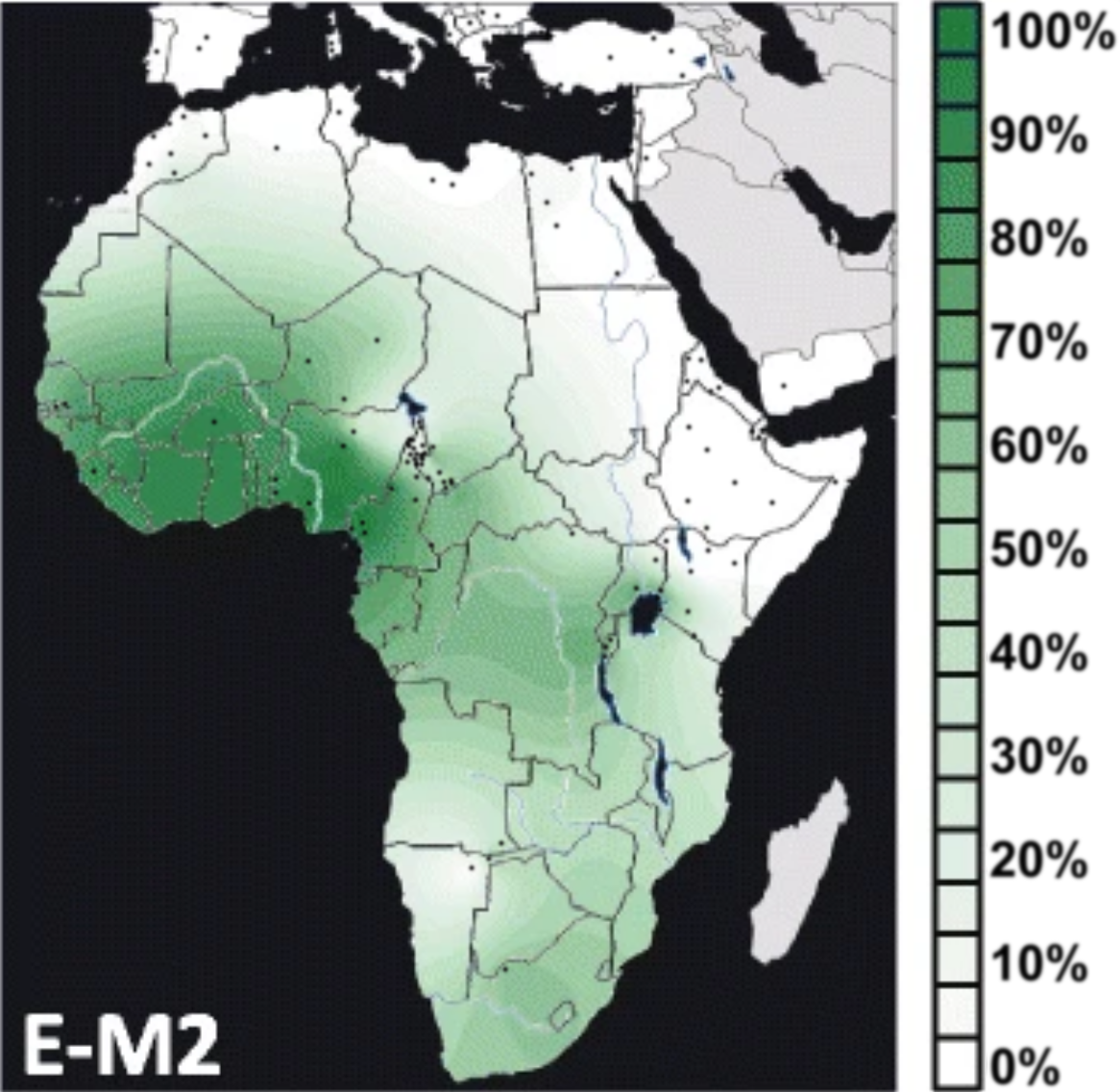
- Interpolated frequency distribution.
- Possible time of origin: 39,200 years BP
- Coalescence age: 16,300 years BP
- Possible place of origin: West Africa or Central Africa
- Ancestor: E-V38
- Descendants: E-Z5994, E-V43
- Defining mutations: M2, DYS271/SY81, M291, P1/PN1, P189.1, P293.1

Haplogroup E-M2, also known as E1b1a1-M2, is a human Y-chromosome DNA haplogroup. E-M2 is primarily distributed within Africa followed by West Asia. More specifically, E-M2 is the predominant subclade in West Africa, Central Africa, Southern Africa, and the region of the African Great Lakes; it also occurs at moderate frequencies in North Africa, and the Middle East. E-M2 has several subclades, but many of these subhaplogroups are included in either E-L485 or E-U175. E-M2 is especially common among indigenous Africans who speak Niger-Congo languages, and was spread to Southern Africa and East Africa through the Bantu expansion.

== Origins ==
The discovery of two SNPs (V38 and V100) by Trombetta et al. (2011) significantly redefined the E-V38 phylogenetic tree. This led the authors to suggest that E-V38 may have originated in East Africa. E-V38 joins the West African-affiliated E-M2 and the Northeast African-affiliated E-M329 with an earlier common ancestor who, like E-P2, may have also originated in East Africa. According to Wood et al. (2005) and Rosa et al. (2007), such population movements changed the pre-existing population Y chromosomal diversity in Central, Southern, and Southeastern Africa, replacing the previous haplogroup frequencies in these areas with the now dominant E1b1a1 lineages. Traces of earlier inhabitants, however, can be observed today in these regions via the presence of the Y DNA haplogroups A1a, A1b, A2, A3, and B-M60 that are common in certain populations, such as the Mbuti and Khoisan. Shriner et al. (2018) similarly suggests that haplogroup E1b1a-V38 traversed across the Green Sahara from east to west around 19,000 years ago, where E1b1a1-M2 may have subsequently originated in West Africa or Central Africa. Shriner et al. (2018) also traces this movement via sickle cell mutation, which likely originated during the Green Sahara period.

== Ancient DNA ==
=== Within Africa ===
==== Botswana ====
At Xaro, in Botswana, there were two individuals, dated to the Early Iron Age (1400 BP); one carried haplogroups E1b1a1a1c1a and L3e1a2, and another carried haplogroups E1b1b1b2b (E-M293, E-CTS10880) and L0k1a2.

At Taukome, in Botswana, an individual, dated to the Early Iron Age (1100 BP), carried haplogroups E1b1a1 (E-M2, E-Z1123) and L0d3b1.

==== Democratic Republic of Congo ====
At Kindoki, in the Democratic Republic of Congo, there were three individuals, dated to the protohistoric period (230 BP, 150 BP, 230 BP); one carried haplogroups E1b1a1a1d1a2 (E-CTS99, E-CTS99) and L1c3a1b, another carried haplogroup E (E-M96, E-PF1620), and the last carried haplogroups R1b1 (R-P25 1, R-M415) and L0a1b1a1.

==== Egypt ====
Hawass et al. (2012) determined that the ancient Egyptian mummy of an unknown man buried with Ramesses III was, because of the proven genetic relationship and a mummification process that suggested punishment, a good candidate for the pharaoh's son, Pentaweret, who was the only son to revolt against his father. It was impossible to determine his cause of death. Using Whit Athey's haplogroup predictor based on Y-STR values, both mummies were predicted to share the Y chromosomal haplogroup E1b1a1-M2 and 50% of their genetic material, which pointed to a father-son relationship. Gad et al. (2021) indicates that Ramesses III and Unknown Man E, possibly Pentawere, carried haplogroup E1b1a, which appears at its highest frequency rates in Central Africa at ~60% and in West Africa at ~80%.

During the 18th Dynasty of Ancient Egypt, some mummies from the Amarna Period carried haplogroups E1b1a and L.

==== Kenya ====
At Deloraine Farm, in Nakuru County, Kenya, an iron metallurgist of the Iron Age carried haplogroups E1b1a1a1a1a/E-M58 and L5b1.

At Lamu, Pate Island, Faza, in Kenya, an individual, dated between 1500 CE and 1700 CE, carried haplogroups E1b1a1a1a2a1a and L3e3a.

At Taita Taveta, Makwasinyi, in Kenya, an individual, dated between 1650 CE and 1950 CE, carried haplogroups E1b1a1a1a2a1a and L4b2a.

At Taita Taveta, Makwasinyi, in Kenya, an individual, dated between 1650 CE and 1950 CE, carried haplogroups E1b1a1a1a2a1a3b1d1c and L1c3b1a.

At Taita Taveta, Makwasinyi, in Kenya, an individual, dated between 1650 CE and 1950 CE, carried haplogroups E1b1a1a1a2a1a and L2a1+143.

At Taita Taveta, Makwasinyi, in Kenya, an individual, dated between 1667 cal CE and 1843 cal CE, carried haplogroups E1b1a1a1a2a1a3b1d1c and L2a1+143.

At Taita Taveta, Makwasinyi, in Kenya, an individual, dated between 1709 cal CE and 1927 cal CE, carried haplogroups E1b1a1a1a2a1a3a1d~ and L3a2.

==== Tanzania ====
At Songo Mnara, in Tanzania, an individual, dated between 1418 cal CE and 1450 cal CE, carried haplogroups E1b1a1~ and L3e2b.

At Lindi, in Tanzania, an individual, dated between 1511 cal CE and 1664 cal CE, carried haplogroups E1b1a1a1a2a1a3a1d~ and L0a1a2.

=== Outside of Africa ===
==== Croatia ====
At Dalmatia, in Hvar, Croatia, an adult male individual, dated between the 3rd century CE and the 5th century CE, carried haplogroups E1b1a1a1a1c1b2a2 and HV.

==== France ====
At Pont-sur-Seine, in France, a male individual, dated to the Middle Neolithic, carried haplogroups E1b1a1a1a1c2c and U5b1-16189-@16192.

==== Mexico ====
At a San Jose de los Naturales Royal Hospital burial site, in Mexico City, Mexico, three enslaved West Africans of West African and Southern African ancestry, dated between 1453 CE and 1626 CE, 1450 CE and 1620 CE, and 1436 CE and 1472 CE, were found; one carried haplogroups E1b1a1a1c1b/E-M263.2 and L1b2a, another carried haplogroups E1b1a1a1d1/E-P278.1/E-M425 and L3d1a1a, and the last carried haplogroups E1b1a1a1c1a1c/E-CTS8030 and L3e1a1a. Human leukocyte antigen alleles further confirm that the individuals were of Sub-Saharan African origin.

==== Portugal ====
At Cabeço da Amoreira, in Portugal, an enslaved West African man, who may have been from the Senegambian coastal region of Gambia, Mauritania, or Senegal, and carried haplogroups E1b1a and L3b1a, was buried among shell middens between the 16th century CE and the 18th century CE.

==== Saint Helena ====
In Saint Helena, 20 freed Africans, who were dated to the 19th century CE, were also of western Central African (e.g., Bantu peoples of Gabon and Angola) ancestry. One female individual carried haplogroup L1b1a10b. One female individual carried haplogroup L2a1f. One female individual carried haplogroup L2a1a3c. One male individual carried haplogroups E1b1a1a1a2a1a3b1d and L1c3a. One male individual carried haplogroups E1b1a1a1a1c1a1a and L0a1b2a. One male individual carried haplogroups E1b1a1a1a2a1a3b1a2a2 and L0a1e. One male individual carried haplogroups E1b1a1a1a2a1a3b1 and L2a1f1. One male individual carried haplogroups E1b1a1 and L3. One male individual carried haplogroups E1b1a1a1a2a1a3b1d and L3e1e. One male individual carried haplogroups E1b1a1a1a2a1a3a1d and L3e3b2. One male individual carried haplogroups E1b1a1a1a1c1a1a3 and L3e1a3a. One male individual carried haplogroups E1b1a1a1a2a1a3b1a2a2 and L2b1a. One male individual carried haplogroups E1b1a1a1a2a1a3b1 and L3f1b1a. One male individual carried haplogroups E1b1a1a1a2a1a3b1d1c1a and L3d3a1. One male individual carried haplogroups B2a1a1a1 and L3e2b1. One male individual carried haplogroups E1b1a1a1a2a1a3b1d1c1a and L2a1f. One male individual carried haplogroups E1b1a1a1a1c1a1a3a1c1 and L3e1d1a. One male individual carried haplogroups E1b1a1a1a2a1a3a1d and L1b1a10. One male individual carried haplogroups E1b1a1a1a1c1a1a3a1c and L2a1f1. One male individual carried haplogroups E1b1a1a1a1c1a1 and L2b1a. An enslaved African American man and woman, from the 18th century CE Anson Street burial site in Charleston, South Carolina, who carried haplogroup L3e1e, shared this haplogroup with freed Africans in Saint Helena. Based on those who were present among enslaved Africans, the ratio of males-to-females supports the conclusion of there being a strong selection bias for males in the latter period of the Trans-Atlantic Slave Trade. Consequently, due to this study on the freed Africans of Saint Helena, among other studies, greater genetic insights have been made into the Trans-Atlantic Slave Trade and its effects on the demographics of Africa.

==== Spain ====
In Granada, a Muslim (Moor) of the Cordoba Caliphate, who was of haplogroups E1b1a1 and H1+16189, as well as estimated to date between 900 CE and 1000 CE, and a Morisco, who was of haplogroup L2e1, as well as estimated to date between 1500 CE and 1600 CE, were both found to be of West African (i.e., Gambian) and Iberian descent.

Out of nine male individuals and four female individuals, there were two Sub-Saharan African male individuals from the western and central Sahel found at Ibiza, in Spain. One male individual, who had close genetic relatedness to Laal speakers and the Nilo-Saharan-speaking Sara people from southern Chad, carried haplogroups E1b1a1a1a and L3e1c. The other male individual, who had close genetic relatedness to Niger-Congo-speakers from The Gambia and the Bedik people of Senegal, within the broader region of Senegambia, carried haplogroups E1b1b1a1a1c2 and L3b2. Both Sub-Saharan African individuals were radiocarbon dated to after 1115 CE, and may have been associated with enslavement and trafficking among the Almoravids for the military purpose of recruitment and the Trans-Saharan trade routes along North Africa.

==== United States of America ====
At Avery's Rest, in Chesapeake, Delaware, 3 out of 11 individuals were African Americans, who were dated between 1675 CE and 1725 CE; one was of West African ancestry and carried haplogroups E1b1a-CTS2447 and L3e3b, another was of western Central African Bantu-speaking ancestry and carried E1b1a-Z5974 and L0a1a2, and another was of West African and East African ancestry and carried E1b1a-Z5974 and L3d2.

At Catoctin Furnace African American Cemetery, in Catoctin Furnace, Maryland, there were 27 African Americans found who were dated between 1774 CE and 1850 CE. One male individual, who was of 98.14% Sub-Saharan African ancestry, carried haplogroups E1b1a1a1a1c2c and L2a1+143+@16309. One male individual, who was of 83.73% Sub-Saharan African and 7.74% European ancestry, carried haplogroups E1b1a1a1a1c1b1 and L3e2a1b1. One male individual, who was of 84.94% Sub-Saharan African and 9.45% European ancestry, carried haplogroups E1b1a1a1a2a1a and L2a1+143+16189 (16192)+@16309. One male individual, who was of 87.83% Sub-Saharan African and 8.23% European ancestry, carried haplogroups E1b1a1a1a1c1a1a3a1d1 and L3d1b3. One male individual, who was of 98.14% Sub-Saharan African ancestry, carried haplogroups E1b1a1a1a1a and L3e2a1b1. One male individual, who was of 93.87% Sub-Saharan African and 2.58% European ancestry, carried haplogroups E1b1a1a1 and L3e1. One male individual, who was of 98.70% Sub-Saharan African ancestry, carried haplogroups E1b1a1a1a1c1b2a and L2a1a1. One male individual, who was of 97.01% Sub-Saharan African ancestry, carried haplogroups E1b1a1a1a1c1a1 and L3e2a1b1. One male individual, who was of 82.31% Sub-Saharan African and 10.24% European ancestry, carried haplogroups E1b1a1a1a1c1b and L3e2a1b1. One male individual, who was of 91.82% Sub-Saharan African and 5.31% European ancestry, carried haplogroups E1b1a1a1a1c1a1 and L3e2. One male individual, who was of 81.18% Sub-Saharan African and 14.86% European ancestry, carried haplogroups E1b1a1~ and L2c.

At an Anson Street burial site, in Charleston, South Carolina, there were 18 African Americans found who were dated to the 18th century CE. Banza was of western Central African ancestry and carried haplogroups E1b1a-CTS668 and L3e3b1. Lima was of West African ancestry and carried haplogroups E1b1a-M4671 and L3b3. Kuto was of western Central African ancestry and carried haplogroups E1b1a-CTS2198 and L2a1a2. Anika was of Sub-Saharan African ancestry and carried haplogroups E1b1a-CTS6126 and L2b1. Nana was of West African ancestry and carried haplogroup L2b3a. Zimbu was of western Central African ancestry and carried haplogroups E1b1a-CTS5497 and L3e1e. Wuta was of Sub-Saharan African ancestry and carried haplogroups E1b1a-CTS7305 and L3e2b+152. Daba was of West African ancestry and carried haplogroups E1b1a-M4273 and L2c. Fumu was of Sub-Saharan African ancestry and carried haplogroups B2a1a-Y12201 and L3e2b+152. Lisa was of West African ancestry and carried haplogroups E1b1a-Z6020 and H100. Ganda was of West African ancestry and carried haplogroups E1b1a-CTS5612 and L1c1c. Coosaw was of West African and Native American ancestry and carried haplogroups E2b1a-CTS2400 and A2. Kidzera was of western Central African ancestry and carried haplogroup L2a1a2c. Pita was of Sub-Saharan African ancestry and carried haplogroups E1b1a-M4287 and L3e2b. Tima was of western Central African ancestry and carried haplogroup L3e1e. Jode was of Sub-Saharan African ancestry and carried haplogroups E1b1a-CTS4975 and L2a1a2c. Ajana was of western Central African ancestry and carried haplogroup L2a1I. Isi was of western Central African ancestry and carried haplogroup L3e2a.

== Medical DNA ==
=== Sickle Cell ===
Amid the Green Sahara, the mutation for sickle cell originated in the Sahara or in the northwest forest region of western Central Africa (e.g., Cameroon) by at least 7,300 years ago, though possibly as early as 22,000 years ago. The ancestral sickle cell haplotype to modern haplotypes (e.g., Cameroon/Central African Republic and Benin/Senegal haplotypes) may have first arose in the ancestors of modern West Africans, bearing haplogroups E1b1a1-L485 and E1b1a1-U175 or their ancestral haplogroup E1b1a1-M4732. West Africans (e.g., Yoruba and Esan of Nigeria), bearing the Benin sickle cell haplotype, may have migrated through the Northeast Africa into the western Arabia. West Africans (e.g., Mende of Sierra Leone), bearing the Senegal sickle cell haplotype, may have migrated into Mauritania (77% modern rate of occurrence) and Senegal (100%); they may also have migrated across the Sahara, into North Africa, and from North Africa, into Southern Europe, Turkey, and a region near northern Iraq and southern Turkey. Some may have migrated into and introduced the Senegal and Benin sickle cell haplotypes into Basra, Iraq, where both occur equally. West Africans bearing the Benin sickle cell haplotype, may have migrated into the northern region of Iraq (69.5%), Jordan (80%), Lebanon (73%), Oman (52.1%), and Egypt (80.8%).

== Distribution ==
E-M2's frequency and diversity are highest in West Africa. Within Africa, E-M2 displays a west-to-east as well as a south-to-north clinal distribution. In other words, the frequency of the haplogroup decreases as one moves from western and southern Africa toward the eastern and northern parts of Africa.

Incidence of E-M2
| Population group | frequency | References |
|---|---|---|
| Bamileke | 96%-100% | |
| Ewe | 97% | |
| Ga | 97% | |
| Hutu | 94.2% | |
| Yoruba | 93.1% | |
| Tutsi | 85.1% | |
| Fante | 84% | |
| Mandinka | 79%–83% | |
| Ovambo | 82% | |
| Senegalese | 81% | |
| Ganda | 77% | |
| Bijagós | 76% | |
| Balanta | 73% | |
| Fula | 73% | |
| Kikuyu | 73% | |
| Herero | 71% | |
| Nalú | 71% | |

Populations in Northwest Africa, central Eastern Africa and Madagascar have tested at more moderate frequencies.

Incidence of E-M2
| Population group | frequency | References |
|---|---|---|
| Tuareg from Tânout, Niger | 44.4% (8/18 subjects) | |
| Comorian Shirazi | 41% | |
| Tuareg from Gorom-Gorom, Burkina Faso | 16.6% (3/18) | |
| Tuareg from Gossi, Mali | 9.1% (1/9) | |
| Cape Verdeans | 15.9% (32/201) | |
| Maasai | 15.4% (4/26) | |
| Luo | 66% (6/9) | |
| Iraqw | 11.11% (1/9) | |
| Comoros | 23.46% (69/294) | |
| Merina people (also called Highlanders) | 44% (4/9) | |
| Antandroy | 69.6% (32/46) | |
| Antanosy | 48.9% (23/47) | |
| Antaisaka | 37.5% (3/8) | |

E-M2 is found at low to moderate frequencies in North Africa, and Northeast Africa. Some of the lineages found in these areas are possibly due to the Bantu expansion or other migrations. In Eritrea and most of Ethiopia (excluding the Anuak), E-V38 is usually found in the form of E-M329, which is autochthonous, while E-M2 generally indicates Bantu migratory origins.

Incidence of E-M2
| Population group | frequency | References |
|---|---|---|
| Tuareg from Al Awaynat and Tahala, Libya | 46.5% (20/43) (Note: All were positive for U175.) | |
| Oran, Algeria | 8.6% (8/93) | |
| Berbers, southern and north-central Morocco | 9.5% (6/63) 5.8% (4/69) | (Note: The publication refers to E-V38 as H22.) |
| Moroccan Arabs | 6.8% (3/44) 1.9% (1/54) | |
| Saharawis | 3.5% (1/29) | |
| Egyptians | 1.4% (2/147), 0% (0/73), 8.33% (3/36) | |
| Tunisians | 1.4% (2/148) | |
| Sudanese (may include Hausa migrants) | 0.9% (4/445) | |
| Somalia nationals (may include Bantu minorities) | 1.5% (3/201) | |

Outside of Africa, E-M2 has been found at low frequencies. The clade has been found at low frequencies in West Asia. A few isolated occurrences of E-M2 have also been observed among populations in Southern Europe, such as Croatia, Malta, Spain and Portugal.

Incidence of E-M2 in Asia
| Population group | frequency | References |
|---|---|---|
| Bahrain | 8.6% (46/562) | |
| Saudi Arabians | 6.6% (11/157) | |
| Omanis | 6.6% (8/121) | |
| Emiratis | 5.5% (9/164) | |
| Yemenis | 4.8% (3/62) | |
| Cypriots | 3.2% (2/62) | |
| Southern Iranians | 1.7% (2/117) | |
| Jordanians | 1.4% (2/139) | |
| Sri Lanka | 1.4% (9/638) | |
| Aeolian Islands, Italy | 1.2% (1/81) | |

The Trans-Atlantic slave trade brought people to North America, Central America and South America including the Caribbean. Consequently, the haplogroup is often observed in the United States populations in men who self-identify as African Americans. It has also been observed in a number of populations in Mexico, the Caribbean, Central America, and South America among people of African descent.

Incidence of E-M2 in populations of the Americas
| Population group | frequency | References |
|---|---|---|
| Americans | 7.7–7.9% (Note: E-M2 is approximately 7.7–7.9% of total US male population.) | |
| Cubans | 9.8% (13/132) | |
| Dominicans | 5.69% (2/26) | |
| Puerto Ricans | 19.23% (5/26) | |
| Nicaraguans | 5.5% (9/165) | |
| Several populations of Colombians | 6.18% (69/1116) | |
| Alagoas, Brazil | 4.45% (11/247) | |
| Bahia, Brazil | 19% (19/100) | |
| Bahamians | 58.63% (251/428) | |

== Subclades ==
=== E1b1a1 ===
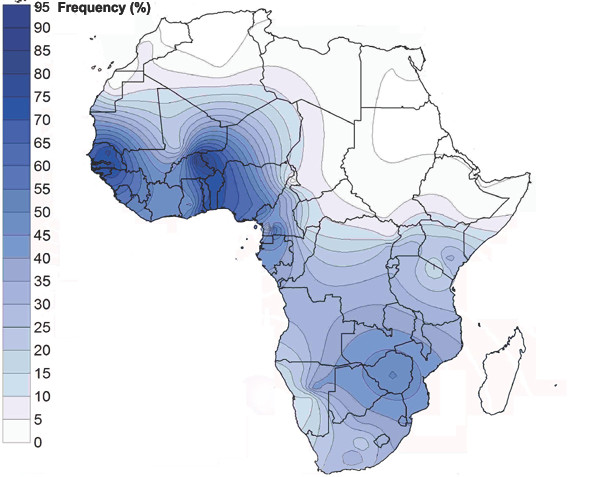
African spatial distribution of haplogroup E3a-M2. Rosa et al. (2007)

E1b1a1 is defined by markers DYS271/M2/SY81, M291, P1/PN1, P189, P293, V43, and V95. Whilst E1b1a reaches its highest frequency of 81% in Senegal, only 1 of the 139 Senegalese that were tested showed M191/P86. In other words, as one moves to West Africa from western Central Africa, the less subclade E1b1a1f is found. Cruciani et al. (2002) states: "A possible explanation might be that haplotype 24 chromosomes [E-M2*] were already present across the Sudanese belt when the M191 mutation, which defines haplotype 22, arose in central western Africa. Only then would a later demic expansion have brought haplotype 22 chromosomes from central western to western Africa, giving rise to the opposite clinal distributions of haplotypes 22 and 24."

=== E1b1a1a1 ===
E1b1a1a1 is commonly defined by M180/P88. The basal subclade is quite regularly observed in M2+ samples.

=== E1b1a1a1a ===
E1b1a1a1a is defined by marker M58. 5% (2/37) of the town Singa-Rimaïbé, Burkina Faso tested positive for E-M58. 15% (10/69) of Hutus in Rwanda tested positive for M58. Three South Africans tested positive for this marker. One Carioca from Rio de Janeiro, Brazil tested positive for the M58 SNP. The place of origin and age is unreported.

=== E1b1a1a1b ===
E1b1a1a1b is defined by M116.2, a private marker. A single carrier was found in Mali. (Note: The publication transposes M116.2 with M116.1 in Table 1.)

=== E1b1a1a1c ===
E1b1a1a1c is defined by private marker M149. This marker was found in a single South African.

=== E1b1a1a1d ===
E1b1a1a1d is defined by a private marker M155. It is known from a single carrier in Mali.

=== E1b1a1a1e ===
E1b1a1a1e is defined by markers M10, M66, M156 and M195. Wairak people in Tanzania tested 4.6% (2/43) positive for E-M10. E-M10 was found in a single person of the Lissongo group in the Central African Republic and two members in a "Mixed" population from the Adamawa region.

=== E1b1a1a1f ===
E1b1a1a1f is defined by L485. The basal node E-L485* appears to be somewhat uncommon but has not been sufficiently tested in large populations. The ancestral L485 SNP (along with several of its subclades) was very recently discovered. Some of these SNPs have little or no published population data and/or have yet to receive nomenclature recognition by the YCC.

- E1b1a1a1f1 is defined by marker L514. This SNP is currently without population study data outside of the 1000 Genomes Project.
- E1b1a1a1f1a (YCC E1b1a7) is defined by marker M191/P86. Filippo et al. (2011) studied a number of African populations that were E-M2 positive and found the basal E-M191/P86 (without E-P252/U174) in a population of Gur speakers in Burkina Faso. Montano et al. (2011) found similar sparse distribution of E-M191* in Nigeria, Gabon, Cameroon and Congo. M191/P86 positive samples occurred in tested populations of Annang (38.3%), Ibibio (45.6%), Efik (45%), and Igbo (54.3%) living in Nigeria, West Africa. E-M191/P86 appears in varying frequencies in Central and Southern Africa but almost all are also positive for P252/U174. Bantu-speaking South Africans (89/343) tested 25.9% positive and Khoe-San speaking South Africans tested 7.7% (14/183) positive for this SNP. It also appears commonly in Africans living in the Americas. A population in Rio de Janeiro, Brazil tested 9.2% (12/130) positive. 34.9% (29/83) of African American men tested positive for M191.

Veeramah et al. (2010) studies of the recombining portions of M191 positive Y chromosomes suggest that this lineage has "diffusely spread with multiple high frequency haplotypes implying a longer evolutionary period since this haplogroup arose". The subclade E1b1a1a1f1a appears to express opposite clinal distributions to E1b1a1* in the West African Savanna region. Haplogroup E1b1a1a1f1a (E-M191) has a frequency of 23% in Cameroon (where it represents 42% of haplotypes carrying the DYS271 mutation or E-M2), 13% in Burkina Faso (16% of haplotypes carrying the M2/DYS271 mutation) and only 1% in Senegal. Similarly, while E1b1a reaches its highest frequency of 81% in Senegal, only 1 of the 139 Senegalese that were tested showed M191/P86. In other words, as one moves to West Africa from western Central Africa, the less subclade E1b1a1f is found. "A possible explanation might be that haplotype 24 chromosomes [E-M2*] were already present across the Sudanese belt when the M191 mutation, which defines haplotype 22, arose in central western Africa. Only then would a later demic expansion have brought haplotype 22 chromosomes from central western to western Africa, giving rise to the opposite clinal distributions of haplotypes 22 and 24."

- E1b1a1a1f1a1 (YCC E1b1a7a) is defined by P252/U174. It appears to be the most common subclade of E-L485. It is believed to have originated near western Central Africa. It is rarely found in the most western portions of West Africa. Montano et al. (2011) found this subclade very prevalent in Nigeria and Gabon. Filippo et al. (2011) estimated a tMRCA of ~4.2 kya from sample of Yoruba population positive for the SNP.
- E1b1a1a1f1a1b (YCC E1b1a7a2) is defined by P115. This subclade has only been observed amongst Fang people of Central Africa.
- E1b1a1a1f1a1c (YCC E1b1a7a3) is defined by P116. Montano et al. (2011) observed this SNP only in Gabon and a Bassa population from Cameroon.
- E1b1a1a1f1a1d is defined by Z1704. This subclade has been observed across Africa. The 1000 Genomes Project Consortium found this SNP in Yoruba Nigerian, three Kenyan Luhyas and one African descent Puerto Rican.
- E1b1a1a1f1b is defined by markers L515, L516, L517, and M263.2. This subclade was found by the researchers of Y-Chromosome Genome Comparison Project using data from the commercial bioinformatics company 23andMe.

=== E1b1a1a1g ===
E1b1a1a1g (YCC E1b1a8) is defined by marker U175. The basal E-U175* is extremely rare. Montano et al. (2011) only found one out of 505 tested African subjects who was U175 positive but negative for U209. Brucato et al. found similarly low frequencies of basal E-U175* in subjects in the Ivory Coast and Benin. Veeramah et al. (2010) found U175 in tested Annang (45.3%), Ibibio (37%), Efik (33.3%), and Igbo (25.3%) but did not test for U209.

The supposed "Bantu haplotype" found in E-U175 carriers is "present at appreciable frequencies in other Niger–Congo languages speaking peoples as far west as Guinea-Bissau". This is the modal haplotype of STR markers that is common in carriers of E-U175. (Note: The YCAII STR marker value of 19–19 is also usually indicative of U175.)

| E-U175 haplotype | DYS19 | DYS388 | DYS390 | DYS391 | DYS392 | DYS393 |
| | 15 | 12 | 21 | 10 | 11 | 13 |

E1b1a1a1g has several subclades.

- E1b1a1a1g1 (YCC E1b1a8a) is defined by U209. It is the most prominent subclade of U175. This subclade has very high frequencies of over fifty percentages in Cameroonian populations of Bassa and Bakaka, possibly indicating place of origin. However, E-U209 is widely found at lower frequencies in West and Central African countries surrounding Cameroon and Gabon. Brucato et al. (2010) found the SNP in a populations of Ahizi (in Ivory Coast) 38.8% (19/49), Yacouba (Ivory Coast) 27.5% (11/40), and Beninese 6.5% (5/77) respectively.
- E1b1a1a1g1a (YCC E1b1a8a1) is defined by U290. The Montano et al. (2011) study of U290 showed a lower frequency in Nigeria (11.7%) and western Central Africa than basal node U209. The highest population frequency rate in that study was 57.7% (15/26) in Ewondo in Cameroon. 32.5% (27/83) of African American men tested by Sims et al. (2007) were positive for this SNP.
- E1b1a1a1g1a2 is defined by Z1725. This marker has been observed by The 1000 Genomes Project Consortium in Yoruba Nigerians and Luhya Kenyans.
- E1b1a1a1g1c (YCC E1b1a4) is defined by M154. A Bamilike population tested 31.3% (15/48) for the marker. Bakaka speakers from Cameroon tested 8%. An Ovimbundu test population found this SNP at 14% (14/100). Members of this subclade have also been found in South Africa.
- E1b1a1a1g1d is defined by V39. Trombetta et al. first published this SNP in 2011 but gave little population data about it. It is only known to have been found in an African population.

=== E1b1a1a1h ===
E1b1a1a1h is defined by markers P268 and P269. It was first reported in a person from the Gambia.

== Phylogenetics ==
=== Phylogenetic history ===
Prior to 2002, there were in academic literature at least seven naming systems for the Y-Chromosome Phylogenetic tree. This led to considerable confusion. In 2002, the major research groups came together and formed the Y-Chromosome Consortium (YCC). They published a joint paper that created a single new tree that all agreed to use. Later, a group of citizen scientists with an interest in population genetics and genetic genealogy formed a working group to create an amateur tree aiming at being above all timely. The table below brings together all of these works at the point of the landmark 2002 YCC Tree. This allows a researcher reviewing older published literature to quickly move between nomenclatures.

| YCC 2002/2008 (Shorthand) | (α) | (β) | (γ) | (δ) | (ε) | (ζ) | (η) | YCC 2002 (Longhand) | YCC 2005 (Longhand) | YCC 2008 (Longhand) | YCC 2010r (Longhand) | ISOGG 2006 | ISOGG 2007 | ISOGG 2008 | ISOGG 2009 | ISOGG 2010 | ISOGG 2011 | ISOGG 2012 |
| E-P29 | 21 | III | 3A | 13 | Eu3 | H2 | B | E* | E | E | E | E | E | E | E | E | E | E |
| E-M33 | 21 | III | 3A | 13 | Eu3 | H2 | B | E1* | E1 | E1a | E1a | E1 | E1 | E1a | E1a | E1a | E1a | E1a |
| E-M44 | 21 | III | 3A | 13 | Eu3 | H2 | B | E1a | E1a | E1a1 | E1a1 | E1a | E1a | E1a1 | E1a1 | E1a1 | E1a1 | E1a1 |
| E-M75 | 21 | III | 3A | 13 | Eu3 | H2 | B | E2a | E2 | E2 | E2 | E2 | E2 | E2 | E2 | E2 | E2 | E2 |
| E-M54 | 21 | III | 3A | 13 | Eu3 | H2 | B | E2b | E2b | E2b | E2b1 | - | - | - | - | - | - | - |
| E-P2 | 25 | III | 4 | 14 | Eu3 | H2 | B | E3* | E3 | E1b | E1b1 | E3 | E3 | E1b1 | E1b1 | E1b1 | E1b1 | E1b1 |
| E-M2 | 8 | III | 5 | 15 | Eu2 | H2 | B | E3a* | E3a | E1b1 | E1b1a | E3a | E3a | E1b1a | E1b1a | E1b1a | E1b1a1 | E1b1a1 |
| E-M58 | 8 | III | 5 | 15 | Eu2 | H2 | B | E3a1 | E3a1 | E1b1a1 | E1b1a1 | E3a1 | E3a1 | E1b1a1 | E1b1a1 | E1b1a1 | E1b1a1a1a | E1b1a1a1a |
| E-M116.2 | 8 | III | 5 | 15 | Eu2 | H2 | B | E3a2 | E3a2 | E1b1a2 | E1b1a2 | E3a2 | E3a2 | E1b1a2 | E1b1a2 | E1ba12 | removed | removed |
| E-M149 | 8 | III | 5 | 15 | Eu2 | H2 | B | E3a3 | E3a3 | E1b1a3 | E1b1a3 | E3a3 | E3a3 | E1b1a3 | E1b1a3 | E1b1a3 | E1b1a1a1c | E1b1a1a1c |
| E-M154 | 8 | III | 5 | 15 | Eu2 | H2 | B | E3a4 | E3a4 | E1b1a4 | E1b1a4 | E3a4 | E3a4 | E1b1a4 | E1b1a4 | E1b1a4 | E1b1a1a1g1c | E1b1a1a1g1c |
| E-M155 | 8 | III | 5 | 15 | Eu2 | H2 | B | E3a5 | E3a5 | E1b1a5 | E1b1a5 | E3a5 | E3a5 | E1b1a5 | E1b1a5 | E1b1a5 | E1b1a1a1d | E1b1a1a1d |
| E-M10 | 8 | III | 5 | 15 | Eu2 | H2 | B | E3a6 | E3a6 | E1b1a6 | E1b1a6 | E3a6 | E3a6 | E1b1a6 | E1b1a6 | E1b1a6 | E1b1a1a1e | E1b1a1a1e |
| E-M35 | 25 | III | 4 | 14 | Eu4 | H2 | B | E3b* | E3b | E1b1b1 | E1b1b1 | E3b1 | E3b1 | E1b1b1 | E1b1b1 | E1b1b1 | removed | removed |
| E-M78 | 25 | III | 4 | 14 | Eu4 | H2 | B | E3b1* | E3b1 | E1b1b1a | E1b1b1a1 | E3b1a | E3b1a | E1b1b1a | E1b1b1a | E1b1b1a | E1b1b1a1 | E1b1b1a1 |
| E-M148 | 25 | III | 4 | 14 | Eu4 | H2 | B | E3b1a | E3b1a | E1b1b1a3a | E1b1b1a1c1 | E3b1a3a | E3b1a3a | E1b1b1a3a | E1b1b1a3a | E1b1b1a3a | E1b1b1a1c1 | E1b1b1a1c1 |
| E-M81 | 25 | III | 4 | 14 | Eu4 | H2 | B | E3b2* | E3b2 | E1b1b1b | E1b1b1b1 | E3b1b | E3b1b | E1b1b1b | E1b1b1b | E1b1b1b | E1b1b1b1 | E1b1b1b1a |
| E-M107 | 25 | III | 4 | 14 | Eu4 | H2 | B | E3b2a | E3b2a | E1b1b1b1 | E1b1b1b1a | E3b1b1 | E3b1b1 | E1b1b1b1 | E1b1b1b1 | E1b1b1b1 | E1b1b1b1a | E1b1b1b1a1 |
| E-M165 | 25 | III | 4 | 14 | Eu4 | H2 | B | E3b2b | E3b2b | E1b1b1b2 | E1b1b1b1b1 | E3b1b2 | E3b1b2 | E1b1b1b2a | E1b1b1b2a | E1b1b1b2a | E1b1b1b2a | E1b1b1b1a2a |
| E-M123 | 25 | III | 4 | 14 | Eu4 | H2 | B | E3b3* | E3b3 | E1b1b1c | E1b1b1c | E3b1c | E3b1c | E1b1b1c | E1b1b1c | E1b1b1c | E1b1b1c | E1b1b1b2a |
| E-M34 | 25 | III | 4 | 14 | Eu4 | H2 | B | E3b3a* | E3b3a | E1b1b1c1 | E1b1b1c1 | E3b1c1 | E3b1c1 | E1b1b1c1 | E1b1b1c1 | E1b1b1c1 | E1b1b1c1 | E1b1b1b2a1 |
| E-M136 | 25 | III | 4 | 14 | Eu4 | H2 | B | E3ba1 | E3b3a1 | E1b1b1c1a | E1b1b1c1a1 | E3b1c1a | E3b1c1a | E1b1b1c1a1 | E1b1b1c1a1 | E1b1b1c1a1 | E1b1b1c1a1 | E1b1b1b2a1a1 |

==== Research publications ====
The following research teams per their publications were represented in the creation of the YCC tree.

- α Jobling and Tyler-Smith 2000 and Kaladjieva 2001
- β Underhill 2000
- γ Hammer 2001
- δ Karafet 2001
- ε Semino 2000
- ζ Su 1999
- η Capelli 2001

=== Phylogenetic trees ===
This phylogenetic tree of haplogroup subclades is based on the Y-Chromosome Consortium (YCC) 2008 Tree, the ISOGG Y-DNA Haplogroup E Tree, and subsequent published research.

  - E1b1a1 (DYS271/M2/SY81, M291, P1/PN1, P189, P293, V43, V95, Z1101, Z1107, Z1116, Z1120, Z1122, Z1123, Z1124, Z1125, Z1127, Z1130, Z1133) (Note: DYS271/M2/SY81, P1/PN1, P189, P293, and M291 appear to form E1b1a1*. L576 forms a subclade immediately after the previously mentioned SNPs. L576 gave rise to a deeper subclade of M180/P88, P182, L88.3, L86, and PAGES0006. From this subclade, all the major subclades (i.e. E-U175 and E-L485) of E1b1a evolved. The exact position of V43 and V95 within these three subclades and E1b1a1a1b (M116.2), E1b1a1a1c (M149), and E1b1a1a1d (M155) remains uncertain.)
    - E1b1a1a (L576)
      - E1b1a1a1 (L86.1, L88.3, M180/P88, PAGES00066, P182, Z1111, Z1112)
        - E1b1a1a1a (M58, PAGES00027)
        - E1b1a1a1b (M116.2)
        - E1b1a1a1c (M149)
        - E1b1a1a1d (M155)
        - E1b1a1a1e (M10, M66, M156, M195)
        - E1b1a1a1f (L485)
          - E1b1a1a1f1 (L514)
            - E1b1a1a1f1a (M191/P86, P253/U247, U186, Z1712)
              - E1b1a1a1f1a1 (P252/U174)
                - E1b1a1a1f1a1a (P9.2)
                - E1b1a1a1f1a1b (P115)
                - E1b1a1a1f1a1c (P116)
                  - E1b1a1a1f1a1c1 (P113)
                - E1b1a1a1f1a1d (Z1704)
                - (L372)
            - E1b1a1a1f1b (L515, L516, L517, M263.2)
              - E1b1a1a1f1b1 (Z1893)
                - (Z1894)
        - E1b1a1a1g (U175)
          - E1b1a1a1g1 (L220.3, L652, P277, P278.1, U209, M4254, M4230, CTS4921/M4243/V3224)
            - E1b1a1a1g1a (U290)
              - E1b1a1a1g1a1 (U181)
                - E1b1a1a1g1a1a (L97)
              - E1b1a1a1g1a2 (Z1725)
            - E1b1a1a1g1b (P59)
            - E1b1a1a1g1c (M154)
            - E1b1a1a1g1d (V39)
        - E1b1a1a1h (P268, P269)

== See also ==
=== Genetics ===
- African admixture in Europe
- Genetic genealogy
- Haplogroup D
- Haplogroup DE
- Haplogroup
- Haplotype
- Human Y-chromosome DNA haplogroup
- Molecular phylogenetics
- Paragroup
- Subclade
- Y-chromosome haplogroups in populations of the world
- Y-DNA haplogroups by ethnic group
- Y-DNA haplogroups in populations of Sub-Saharan Africa

=== Y-DNA E subclades ===
- Haplogroup E-L485
- Haplogroup E-M123
- Haplogroup E-M180
- Haplogroup E-M215
- Haplogroup E-M33
- Haplogroup E-M521
- Haplogroup E-M75
- Haplogroup E-M96
- Haplogroup E-P147
- Haplogroup E-P177
- Haplogroup E-P2
- Haplogroup E-V12
- Haplogroup E-V13
- Haplogroup E-V22
- Haplogroup E-V38
- Haplogroup E-M2
- Haplogroup E-V65
- Haplogroup E-V68
- Haplogroup E-Z820
- Haplogroup E-Z827
