= Goines =

Goines is a surname. It may refer to:

== People ==
- David Lance Goines (born 1945), American artist
- Donald Goines (1936–1974), American writer
- Donny Goines, stage name of American rapper Donny Scott
- Gerald Goines, Houston police officer charged with felony murder for an unjustified 2019 police raid
- Lincoln Goines (born 1953), American musician
- Oscar Goines (1893–?), American Negro league baseball player in the 1910s
- Siena Goines (born 1969), American actress
- Victor Goines (born 1961), American jazz musician
- Walter Goines, American Negro league pitcher who played in the 1930s
- William Goines (born 1936), first African-American Navy SEAL

== Fictional characters ==
- Jennifer Goines, a main character in the science-fiction television series 12 Monkeys
