= McGowen =

McGowen is an English language surname. The more common Anglicization of Mac Gobhann is McGowan. Notable people, having the surname alternatively spelled McGowen or Gowen include:

- Franklin B. Gowen (1836–1889), attorney, president of Reading Railroad
- James McGowen (1855–1922), Premier of New South Wales (1910–1913)
- James G. McGowen (1870–1940), justice of the Supreme Court of Mississippi
- Lorraine McGowen (fl. 1990s–2020s), American lawyer

== See also ==
- McGowan, containing detailed etymology and history common to both the McGowan and McGowen surnames
- McGowen station, METRORail station in Houston, Texas
