= Going (company) =

Travel technology company

Going (formerly Scott's Cheap Flights) is an American travel technology company whose primary product is a mobile application that delivers curated airfare deal alerts. The company uses a combination of technology and human curation to identify and evaluate discounted fares, which are sent to subscribers through its app and email service. Going is headquartered in Colorado.

== History ==
In December 2013, journalist Scott Keyes booked a $130 roundtrip "mistake fare" from New York City to Milan, Italy, and shared the details with friends via email. The public response led him to create an unofficial mailing list in 2014 for people interested in receiving similar airfare deal notifications.

In April 2015, a Business Insider feature about Keyes's budget travel strategies drew new interest, leading him to launch a paid subscription tier in August 2015 under the name Scott's Cheap Flights. In late 2015, Brian Kidwell joined the company as the co-founder and CEO.

In early 2020, the company expanded its service to include domestic flight deals. During the early months of the COVID-19 pandemic, the company also provided advice to travelers amidst the uncertain travel environment, such as navigating delays and cancellations from airlines.

In January 2023, Scott's Cheap Flights rebranded to Going. In June 2023, Going launched Going with Points, which offers points-specific flight deal alerts through credit card and airline loyalty programs.

In March 2024, Going released its mobile app for iOS and Android, which includes flight alerts that can be customized to users’ trip preferences.

== Services ==
Going operates a subscription business model for airfare alerts, which sends discounted fare notifications sourced through deal-scoring algorithms and human review to users.

The March 2024 app release added an interactive map to browse real-time deals. In March 2025, the app launched flight alerts based on a user's trip preferences.
