= Haplogroup E-V68 =

Human Y-chromosome DNA haplogroup

- Possible time of origin: c. 24,000 BP
- Coalescence age: c. 19,900 BP
- Possible place of origin: Egypt/Libya or southern Egypt/northern Sudan
- Ancestor: E-M35
- Descendants: E-M78, E-V1039
- Defining mutations: V68, L539, PF2203

Haplogroup E-V68, also known as E1b1b1a, is a major human Y-chromosome DNA haplogroup found in North Africa, the Horn of Africa, Western Asia and Europe. It is a subclade of the larger and older haplogroup, known as E1b1b or E-M215 (also roughly equivalent to E-M35). The E1b1b1a lineage is identified by the presence of a single nucleotide polymorphism (SNP) mutation on the Y chromosome, which is known as V68. It is a subject of discussion and study in genetics as well as genetic genealogy, archaeology, and historical linguistics.

E-V68 is dominated by its longer-known subclade E-M78. In various publications, both E-V68 and E-M78 have been referred to by other names, especially phylogenetic nomenclature such as "E3b1a" which are designed to show their place on the family tree of all males. These various names change as new discoveries are made and are discussed below.

== Origins ==
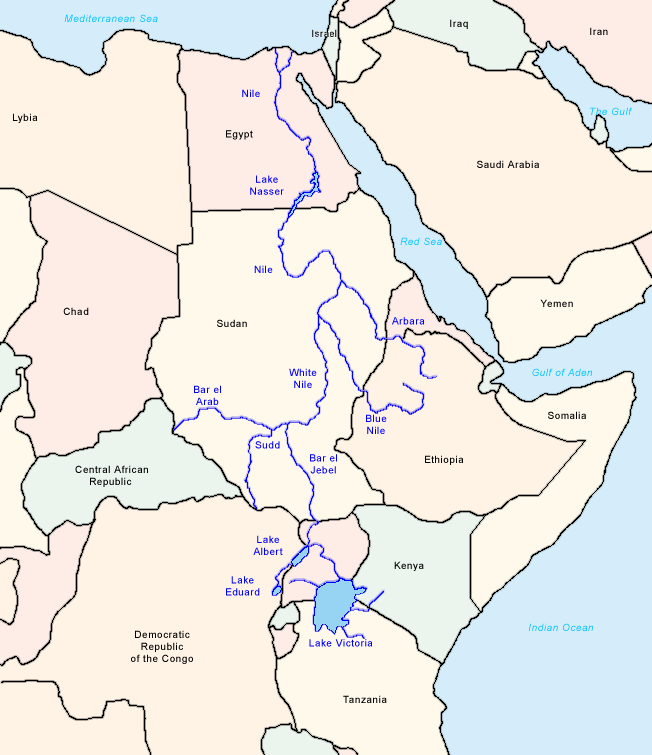
The Nile River and its main tributaries: a probable corridor of ancient migrations, including those involving the Y DNA lineages E-M243, E-M78, E-V12, and E-V22.

E-M78, like its parent clade E-V68, is thought to have an African origin. Based on genetic STR variance data, Cruciani et al. (2007) suggests that this subclade originated in "Northeastern Africa", which in the study refers specifically to the region of Egypt and Libya.

Prior to Cruciani et al. (2007), Semino et al. (2004) had proposed a place of origin for E-M78 further south in East Africa. This was because of the high frequency and diversity of E-M78 lineages in the region of Ethiopia. However, Cruciani et al. (2007) were able to study more data, and concluded that the E-M78 lineages in the Horn of Africa were dominated by relatively recent branches (see E-V32 below). They concluded that the region of Egypt was the likely place of origin of E-M78 based on "the peripheral geographic distribution of the most derived subhaplogroups with respect to northeastern Africa, as well as the results of quantitative analysis of UEP and microsatellite diversity".

Cruciani et al. (2007) also note this as evidence for "a corridor for bidirectional migrations" between Northeast Africa (Egypt and Libya in their data) on the one hand and East Africa on the other. Because Cruciani et al. (2007) also proposed that E-M35, the parent clade of E-M78, originated in East Africa during the Palaeolithic and subsequently spread to the region of Egypt. E-M78 in East Africa, is therefore the result of a back migration. The authors believe there were "at least 2 episodes between 23.9–17.3 ky and 18.0–5.9 ky ago".

Another probable migration to the south from Egypt was noted by Hassan et al. (2008) based upon their survey of Sudan. Specifically E-V12 and E-V22, "might have been brought to Sudan from North Africa after the progressive desertification of the Sahara around 6,000-8,000 years ago".

Northwards from Egypt and Libya, E-M78 migrated into the Middle East, but additionally Trombetta et al. (2011) proposed that the earlier E-V68 carrying population may have migrated by sea directly from Africa to southwestern Europe, because they observed cases of E-V68* (without the M78 mutation) only in Sardinia, and not in the Middle Eastern samples. Concerning E-M78, like other forms of E-V68 there is evidence of multiple routes of expansion out of an African homeland.

On the other hand, while there were apparently direct migrations from North Africa to Iberia and Southern Italy (of people carrying E-V68*, E-V12, E-V22, and E-V65), the majority of E-M78 lineages found in Europe belong to the E-V13 subclade which appears to have entered Europe at some time undetermined from the Near East, where it apparently originated, via the Balkans.

Coming to similar conclusions as the Cruciani and Trombetta team, Battaglia et al. (2008), writing prior to the discovery of E-V68, describe Egypt as "a hub for the distribution of the various geographically localized M78-related sub-clades" and, based on archaeological data, they propose that the point of origin of E-M78 (as opposed to later dispersals from Egypt) may have been in a refugium which "existed on the border of present-day Sudan and Egypt, near Lake Nubia, until the onset of a humid phase around 8500 BC. The northward-moving rainfall belts during this period could have also spurred a rapid migration of Mesolithic foragers northwards in Africa, the Levant and ultimately onwards to Asia Minor and Europe, where they each eventually differentiated into their regionally distinctive branches".

The division of E-V68 into sub-clades such as E-V12, E-V13, etc. has largely been the work of an Italian team including Fulvio Cruciani, Beniamino Trombetta, Rosario Scozzari and others. They started on the basis of STR studies in 2004, and then in 2006 they announced the discoveries of single nucleotide polymorphism (SNP) mutations which could define most of the main branches with better clarity, which was then discussed further in 2007. These articles were the basis of the updated phylogenies found in Karafet et al. (2008), and ISOGG, which is in turn the basis of the phylogeny given below.

Keita (2008) examined a published Y-chromosome dataset on Afro-Asiatic populations and found that a key lineage E-M35/E-M78, sub-clade mutation of haplogroup E, was shared between the populations in the locale of original Egyptian speakers and modern Cushitic speakers from the Horn. These lineages are present in Egyptians, Berbers, Cushitic speakers from the Horn of Africa, and Semitic speakers in the Near-East. He noted that variants are also found in the Aegean and Balkans, but the origin of the M35 subclade was in East Africa, and its clades were dominant in a core portion of Afro-Asiatic speaking populations which included Cushitic, Egyptian and Berber groups, in contrast Semitic speakers showed a decline in frequency going west to east in the Levantine-Syria region. Keita identified high frequencies of M35 (>50%) among Omotic populations, but stated that this derived from a small, published sample of 12. Keita also wrote that the PN2 mutation was shared by M35 and M2 lineages and this defined clade originated from East Africa. He concluded that "the genetic data give population profiles that clearly indicate males of African origin, as opposed to being of Asian or European descent" but acknowledged that the biodiversity does not indicate any specific set of skin colors or facial features as populations were subject to microevolutionary pressures.

Loosdrecht et al. (2018) analysed genome-wide data from seven ancient Iberomaurusian individuals from the Grotte des Pigeons near Taforalt in eastern Morocco. The fossils were directly dated to between 15,100 and 13,900 calibrated years before present. The scientists found that all the male specimens with sufficient nuclear DNA preservation belonged to the E1b1b1a1 (M78) subclade, with one skeleton bearing the E1b1b1a1b1 parent lineage to E-V13. Martiniano et al. (2022) later reassigned all the Taforalt samples to haplogroup E-M78 and none to E-L618, the predecessor to EV13.

According to a multidisciplinary review (2025), written by Christopher Ehret, David Schoenbrun, Steven A Brandt and Shomarka Keita, the E-M35 haplogroup subclade is found among all Afro-Asiatic speaking regions, with the M-78 clade now commonly thought to have arisen in either Sudan or Egypt.

== Age ==
Battaglia et al. (2008) estimated that E-M78 (called E1b1b1a1 in that paper) has been in Europe longer than 10,000 years. And more recently, Lacan et al. (2011) found that human remains excavated in a Spanish funeral cave dated to approximately 7000 years ago were in the E-V13 branch of E-M78.

In June 2015, the M78 mutation and the consequent beginning of the E-M78 and E-V68 family trees was dated by Trombetta et al. to approximately 20,300-14,800 years ago.

== Family tree ==
This phylogenetic tree of haplogroup subclades is based on the ISOGG 2019 tree, as well as the FamilyTreeDNA™ tree.

- V68
  E-V68* (E1b1b1a*)
- M78
  - E-M78* (E1b1b1a1*) (Gurna Oasis) in Egypt, Morocco and Mediterranean.
  - V12
    - E-V12* (E1b1b1a1a*) Found in Egypt, French Basques, Sudan, and other places.
    - E-BY8673 Found in Arabian Peninsula
    - CTS9007
      - FGC14378
        - E-BY8350 Found in the Arabian Peninsula
        - E-V32 Found in Somalia and the Arabian Peninsula
      - CTS693
        - E-CTS10132 Found primarily in Gambia
        - E-CTS4004 Large clade, found all over Europe and West Asia.
  - V13
    - V13
      E-V13* (E1b1b1a1b1a*) The majority of E-V13, and more generally of E-M78 in Europe.
    - V27
      ()
    - P65
      ()
    - L17
      (E1b1b1a1b1a1)
    - L143
      (E1b1b1a1b1a2a)
    - M35.2
      (E1b1b1a1a1b1a3) In this small branch, the M35 mutation has been reversed and lost.
    - L241
      ()
    - L250, L251, L252
      (E1b1b1a1b1a4)
    - L540
      (E1b1b1a1b1a5a1)
  - V22
    - V22
      E-V22* (E1b1b1a1b2*) Found in Egypt, Arabia, the Levant, and in Iraq in smaller frequencies.
    - M148
      (E1b1b1a1b2a1)
    - V19
      ()
  - V65
    (E1b1b1a1a2) Associated with the Maghreb, but also found in Italy and Spain.
  - M521
    (E1b1b1a1c) Found in two individuals in Greece by Battaglia et al. 2008

== Distribution ==
So far, three individuals who are in E-V68 but not E-M78 have been reported in Sardinia, by Trombetta et al. (2011), when announcing the discovery of V68.

E-M78 is widely distributed in North Africa, Horn of Africa, West Asia (stretching as far as Southern Asia), and Europe.

The most basal and rare E-M78* paragroup has been found at its highest frequencies in Egyptians from the Gurna Oasis (5.88%), with lower frequencies also observed in Moroccan Arabs, Sardinians and the Balkans.

The highest frequencies of all the defined E-M78 sub-clades is primarily found amongst Afroasiatic-speaking populations in the large area stretching from the haplogroup's putative place of origin in Upper Egypt to the Sudan and the Horn of Africa.

Outside of this core area of distribution (North Africa and the Horn of Africa), E-V68 is also observed in other parts of the continent at lower frequencies due to more recent dispersals. It is thus found today in pockets of the African Great Lakes and Southern Africa owing to early Afro-Asiatic-speaking settlers from the Horn region, and as far west as Guinea-Bissau, where its presence has been tentatively attributed to trans-Saharan movements of people from North Africa.

The distribution of E-V68 in Europe is dominated by its E-V13 subclade, except in Iberia. E-V13 has a frequency peak centered in parts of the Balkans (approximately 20% in southern areas; up to almost 50% is some particular places and populations) and Italy. It today has lower frequencies toward the western, central and northeastern areas, though E-V13 has been found in a Neolithic burial in Catalonia. This is discussed in more detail below.

Region	Population	n	E-M78	E-M78*	E-V12*	E-V13	E-V22	E-V32	E-V65	Study
Europe	Albanians	55	25.46% = (14/55)	1.82% = (1/55)		23.64% = (13/55)				
Europe	Macedonian Albanians	64	35.94% = (23/64)	1.56% = (1/64)		34.38% = (22/64)				
Europe	Albanians and Macedonian Albanians	55+ 64= 119	31.09% = (37/119)	1.68% = (2/119)		29.41% = (35/119)				
Europe	Kosovar Albanians	114	45.61% = (52/114)	1.75% = (2/114)		43.86% = (50/114)				Peričic et al. (2005)
Europe	Albanians	96	32.29% = (31/96)			32.29% = (31/96)				Cruciani et al. (2007)
Europe	Kosovar Albanians and Macedonian Albanians and Albanians	119+ 114+ 96= 329	36.47% = (120/329)	1.22% = (4/329)		35.26% = (116/329)				Peričic et al. (2005); Cruciani et al. (2007)
Europe	Macedonian Aromanians	57	29.82			29.82				Peričic et al. (2005)
Europe	Serbians	113	20.35	1.77		18.58				Peričic et al. (2005)
Europe	Croatians	108	5.60			5.60				Peričic et al. (2005)
Europe	Crete	193	6.7% = 13/193			6.7% = 13/193				King et al. (2008)
Europe	Greeks from Nea Nikomedeia	57	15.8% = 9/57	1.8% = 1/57		14.0% = 8/57				King et al. (2008)
Europe	Greeks from Sesklo/Dimini	57	38.6% = 22/57	3.5% = 2/57		35.1% = 20/57				King et al. (2008)
Europe	Greeks from Lerna/Franchthi	57	35.1% = 20/57			35.1% = 20/57				King et al. (2008)
Europe	Greeks from Crete and Greeks from Nea Nikomedeia; Greeks from Sesklo/Dimini from Lerna/Franchthi	193+ 57+ 57+ 57= 364	17.58% = 64/364	0.82% = 3/364		16.76% = 61/364				King et al. (2008)
Europe	Continental Greeks	147	19.05% = 28/147			17.69% = 26/147	0.68% = 1/147		0.68% = 1/147	Cruciani et al. (2007)
Europe	Greeks from Crete	215	6.51% = 14/215		0.93% = 2/215	5.58% = 12/215				Cruciani et al. (2007)
Europe	Greeks from Aegean Islands	71	16.9% = 12/71			15.49% = 11/71	1.41% = 1/71			Cruciani et al. (2007)
Europe	Continental Greeks; Greeks from Crete; Greeks from Aegean Islands	147+ 215+ 71= 433	12.47% = 54/433		0.46% = 2/433	11.32% = 49/433	0.46% = 2/433		0.23% = 1/433	Cruciani et al. (2007)
Europe	Greeks from Crete and Greeks from Nea Nikomedeia; Greeks from Sesklo/Dimini from Lerna/Franchthi; Continental Greeks; Greeks from Crete; Greeks from Aegean Islands	364+ 433= 797	14.81% = 118/797	0.38% = 3/797	0.25% = 2/797	13.8% = 110/797	0.25% = 2/797		0.13% = 1/797	King et al. (2008); Cruciani et al. (2007)
Europe	Sicilians	236	11.43		1.27	5.93	3.81		0.42	Di Gaetano et al. (2009)
Europe	Huelva Andalusians	167	6.59		1.20	4.19		0.60	0.60	Ambrosio et al. (2010)
Europe	Macedonians	99	18.18			17.17	1.01			Cruciani et al. (2007)
Europe	Bulgarians	204	16.67		0.49	16.18				Cruciani et al. (2007)
Europe	Sicilians	153	13.07		0.65	7.19	4.58		0.65	Cruciani et al. (2007)
Europe	Northern Italians	94	7.45			5.32	2.13			Cruciani et al. (2007)
Europe	Central Italians	356	7.87		0.28	5.34	1.97		0.28	Cruciani et al. (2007)
Europe	Southern Italians	141	10.64		0.71	8.51	1.42			Cruciani et al. (2007)
Europe	Sardinians	374	3.48	0.27	0.27	1.07	0.8		1.07	Cruciani et al. (2007)
Europe	Northern Portuguese	50	4			4				Cruciani et al. (2007)
Europe	Southern Portuguese	49	4.08			4.08				Cruciani et al. (2007)
Europe	Pasiegos from Cantabria	56								Cruciani et al. (2007)
Europe	Asturians	90	10			5.56	4.44			Cruciani et al. (2007)
Europe	Southern Spaniards	62	3.23				3.23			Cruciani et al. (2007)
Europe	Spanish Basques	55								Cruciani et al. (2007)
Europe	French Basques	16	6.25		6.25					Cruciani et al. (2007)
Europe	French	225	4.44		0.44	4				Cruciani et al. (2007)
Europe	English	28								Cruciani et al. (2007)
Europe	Danish	35	2.86			2.86				Cruciani et al. (2007)
Europe	Germans	77	3.9			3.9				Cruciani et al. (2007)
Europe	Polish	40	2.5			2.5				Cruciani et al. (2007)
Europe	Czechs	268	4.85			4.85				Cruciani et al. (2007)
Europe	Slovaks	24	8.33			8.33				Cruciani et al. (2007)
Europe	Slovenians	104	2.88			2.88				Cruciani et al. (2007)
Europe	Estonians	74	4.05			4.05				Cruciani et al. (2007)
Europe	Belarusians	40								Cruciani et al. (2007)
Europe	Northern Russians	82	3.66			3.66				Cruciani et al. (2007)
Europe	Southern Russians	92	2.17			2.17				Cruciani et al. (2007)
Europe	Ukrainians	11	9.09			9.09				Cruciani et al. (2007)
Europe	Moldovians	77	7.79			7.79				Cruciani et al. (2007)
Europe	Hungarians	106	9.43			9.43				Cruciani et al. (2007)
Europe	Romanians	265	7.55			7.17	0.38			Cruciani et al. (2007)
Northwestern Africa	Moroccan Arabs	55	40	3.64			7.27		29.09	Cruciani et al. (2007)
Northwestern Africa	Asni Berbers	54	3.7				3.7			Cruciani et al. (2007)
Northwestern Africa	Bouhria Berbers	67	1.49			1.49				Cruciani et al. (2007)
Northwestern Africa	Moyen Atlas Berbers	69	10.14						10.14	Cruciani et al. (2007)
Northwestern Africa	Marrakech Berbers	29	6.9		3.45		3.45			Cruciani et al. (2007)
Northwestern Africa	Moroccan Jews	50	12		2	2	8			Cruciani et al. (2007)
Northwestern Africa	Mozabite Berbers	20								Cruciani et al. (2007)
Northeastern Africa	Libyan Jews	25	8			4			4	Cruciani et al. (2007)
Northeastern Africa	Libyan Arabs	10	20						20	Cruciani et al. (2007)
Northeastern Africa	Northern Egyptians (Delta)	72	23.61		5.56	1.39	13.89	2.78		Cruciani et al. (2007)
Northeastern Africa	Egyptian Berbers	93	6.45		2.15				4.3	Cruciani et al. (2007)
Northeastern Africa	Egyptians from Bahari	41	41.46		14.63	2.44	21.95		2.44	Cruciani et al. (2007)
Northeastern Africa	Egyptians from Gurna Oasis	34	17.65	5.88	8.82			2.94		Cruciani et al. (2007)
Northeastern Africa	Egyptians	70	79		79					Trombetta (2015)
Northeastern Africa	Southern Egyptians	79	50.63		44.3	1.27	3.8		1.27	Cruciani et al. (2007)
Eastern Africa	Dinka	26	15.38		3.85		11.54			Hassan et al. (2008)
Eastern Africa	Shilluk	15	13.33				13.33			Hassan et al. (2008)
Eastern Africa	Nuer	12	16.67		16.67					Hassan et al. (2008)
Eastern Africa	Borgu	26	15.38				3.85	11.54		Hassan et al. (2008)
Eastern Africa	Nuba	28	25	3.57	3.57		7.14	10.71		Hassan et al. (2008)
Eastern Africa	Masalit	32	71.88	3.13			15.63	53.13		Hassan et al. (2008)
Eastern Africa	Fur	32	59.38				18.75	40.63		Hassan et al. (2008)
Eastern Africa	Nubians	39	15.38		12.82			2.56		Hassan et al. (2008)
Eastern Africa	Fulani from Sudan	26	34.62				30.77	3.85		Hassan et al. (2008)
Eastern Africa	Hausa from Sudan	32	3.13					3.13		Hassan et al. (2008)
Eastern Africa	Egyptian Copts from Sudan	33	15.15		15.15					Hassan et al. (2008)
Eastern Africa	Beja	42	35.71		4.76			30.95		Hassan et al. (2008)
Eastern Africa	Gaalien	50	18.00		6.00		6.00	6.00		Hassan et al. (2008)
Eastern Africa	Meseria	28	14.29		3.57			10.71		Hassan et al. (2008)
Eastern Africa	Arakien	24	16.67		8.33		4.17	4.17		Hassan et al. (2008)
Eastern Africa	Amhara	34	8.82					8.82		Cruciani et al. (2007)
Eastern Africa	Ethiopian Jews	22	9.09					9.09		Cruciani et al. (2007)
Eastern Africa	Mixed Ethiopians	12	33.33				25	8.33		Cruciani et al. (2007)
Eastern Africa	Borana/Oromo (Kenya/Ethiopia)	32	40.63					40.63		Cruciani et al. (2007)
Eastern Africa	Wolayta	12	16.67				8.33	8.33		Cruciani et al. (2007)
Eastern Africa	Saho from Eritrea	94	88.3				88.3			Trombetta (2015)
Eastern Africa	Somali from Ethiopia	12	33.3				8.3	25		Trombetta (2015)
Eastern Africa	Somali from Somalia	5	80					80		Trombetta (2015)
Eastern Africa	Somali from Kenya	6	80					80		Trombetta (2015)
Eastern Africa	Nilotic from Kenya	18	11.11				11.11			Cruciani et al. (2007)
Eastern Africa	Bantu from Kenya	28	3.57					3.57		Cruciani et al. (2007)
Eastern Africa	Western Africa	123	0.81		0.81					Cruciani et al. (2007)
Eastern Africa	Central Africa	150	0.67		0.67					Cruciani et al. (2007)
Eastern Africa	Southern Afric	105								Cruciani et al. (2007)
Western Asia	Istanbul Turkish	35	8.57			2.86	5.71			Cruciani et al. (2007)
Western Asia	Southwestern Turkish	40	2.5			2.5				Cruciani et al. (2007)
Western Asia	Northeastern Turkish	41								Cruciani et al. (2007)
Western Asia	Southeastern Turkish	24	4.17			4.17				Cruciani et al. (2007)
Western Asia	Erzurum Turkish	25	4		4					Cruciani et al. (2007)
Western Asia	Central Anatolian	61	6.56		1.64	4.92				Cruciani et al. (2007)
Western Asia	Turkish Cypriots	46	13.04			10.87	2.17			Cruciani et al. (2007)
Western Asia	Samaritan Levites	2	100				100			
Western Asia	Sephardi Turkish	19								Cruciani et al. (2007)
Western Asia	Palestinians	29	10.34			3.45	6.9			Cruciani et al. (2007)
Western Asia	Druze Arabs	28	10.71			10.71				Cruciani et al. (2007)
Western Asia	Bedouin	28	3.57				3.57			Cruciani et al. (2007)
Western Asia	Syrians	100	2				2			Cruciani et al. (2007)
Western Asia	Kurds from Iraq	20								Cruciani et al. (2007)
Western Asia	Arabs from United Arab Emirates	40	2.5				2.5			Cruciani et al. (2007)
Western Asia	Omanite	106	0.94				0.94			Cruciani et al. (2007)
Western Asia	Adygei	18								Cruciani et al. (2007)
Western Asia	Azeri	97	2.06			2.06				Cruciani et al. (2007)

== Subclades of M78 ==
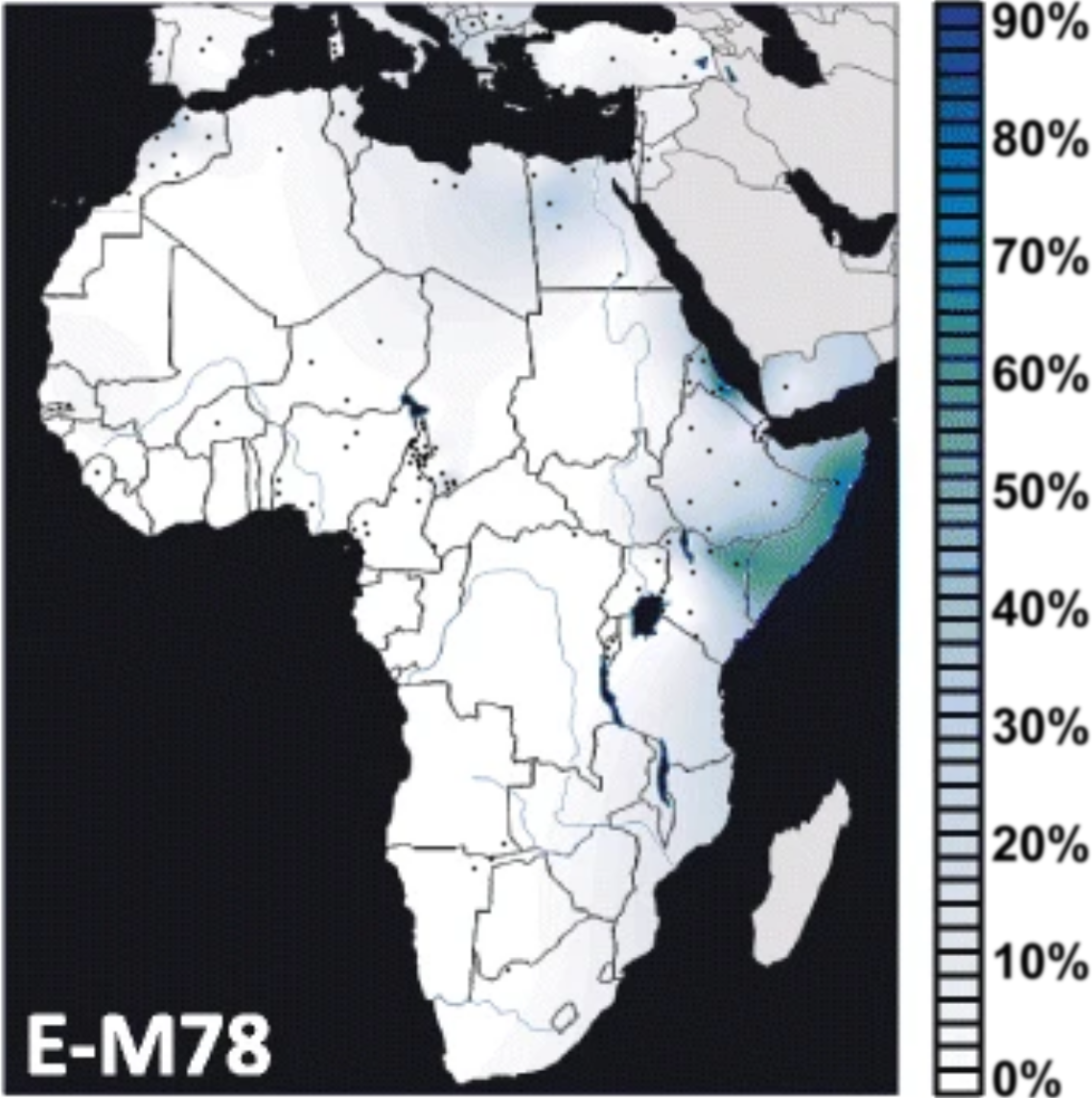
Interpolated frequency distribution of haplogroup E-M78.

Listed here are the main subclades of M78 as of June 2015. Within the E-M78 subclade, Trombetta et al. 2015 allocated most of the former E-M78* chromosomes to three new distinct branches: E-V1083*, E-V1477 and E-V259. The first is a paragroup sister to clades E-V22 and E-V13. The mutation V1477 defines a new basal branch observed only in one northern African sample. Finally, a sister clade of E-V12, defined by V264, includes E-V65 and a new central African lineage defined by V259. The rare M78 subhaplogroup E1b1b1a1-PF2186 has been found at highest frequencies among the Toubou population inhabiting Chad (21%).

- E-M78 (E1b1b1a1) North Africa, Horn of Africa, West Asia, Europe (formerly E1b1b1a).
  - E-M78*
  - E-V1477 Found in Tunisian Jews.
  - E-V1083
  - PF2186 Found among Toubou in Lake Chad area.
    - E-V1083* Found only in Eritrea (1.1%) and Sardinia (0.3%).
    - E-V13 (E1b1b1a1b)
    - E-V22 (E1b1b1a1s)
  - E-V1129
    - E-V12 (E1b1b1a1a)
      - E-V12*
      - E-V32 (E1b1b1a1a2)
    - E-V264
      - E-V259 Found in Chadic (Afro-Asiatic) speakers from Northern Cameroon.
      - E-V65 (E1b1b1a1d)

=== E-V12 ===
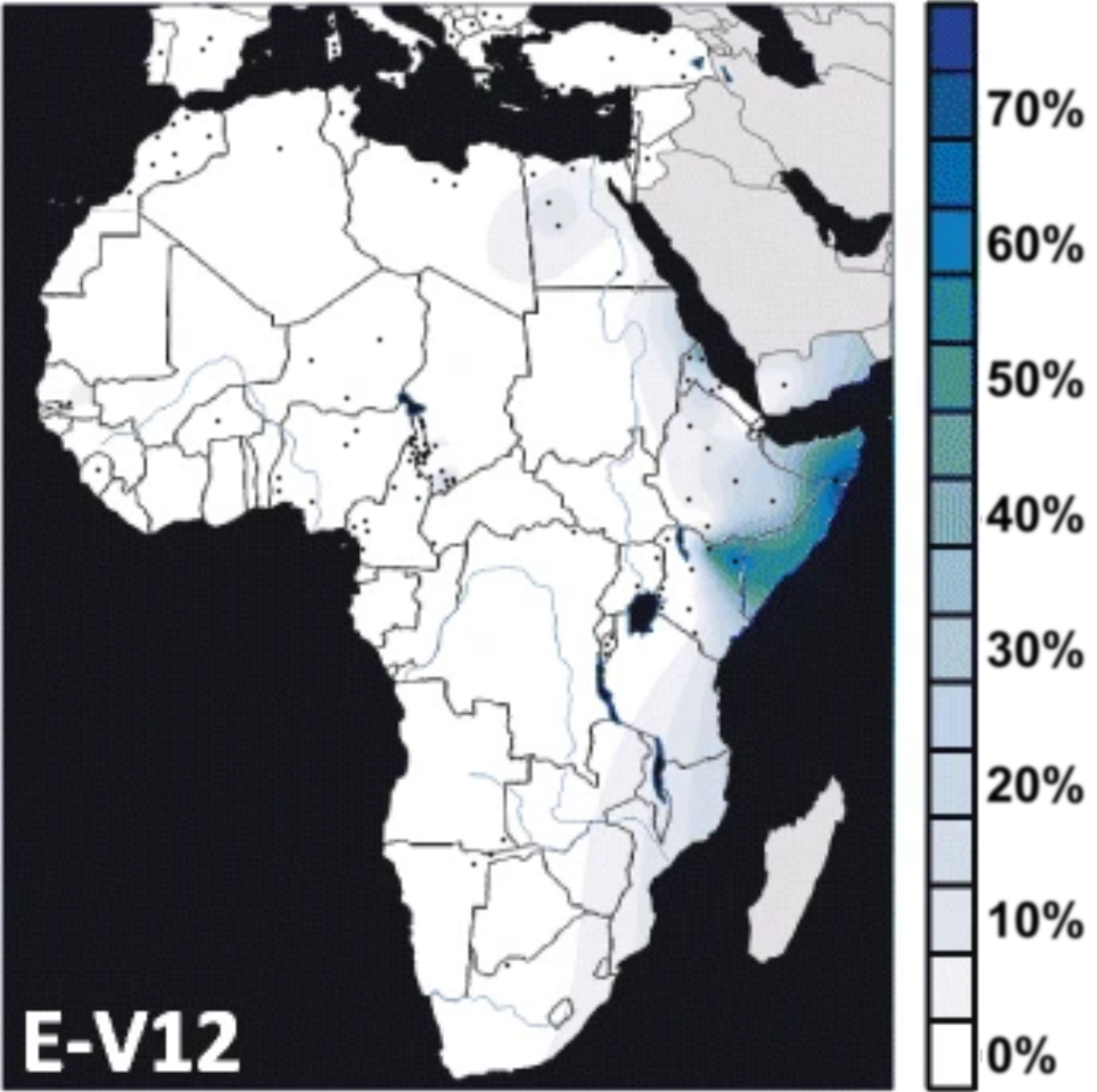
Interpolated frequency distribution of haplogroup E-V12.

This subclade of E-M78 is the one which appears to have split from the others first (it arose c. 13.7-15.2 kya). According to Cruciani et al. (2007), the E-V12 sublineage likely originated in North Africa.

==== Undifferentiated E-V12* lineages ====
Undifferentiated E-V12* lineages (not E-V32 or E-M224, so therefore named "E-V12*") peak in frequency among Southern Egyptians in Aswan (up to 74.5%). The subclades are also scattered widely in small amounts in both Northern Africa and Europe, but with very little sign in Western Asia, apart from Turkey. These E-V12* lineages were formerly included (along with many E-V22* lineages (Note: Cruciani et al. (2004): "E-V22 and E-V12* chromosomes are intermingled and not clearly differentiated by their microsatellite haplotypes". In Cruciani et al. (2007) the same authors show that a branch of E-V13 found amongst the Druze Arabs is also in the delta cluster. (Contrast the data tables of Cruciani et al. (2007) and Cruciani et al. (2004).))) in Cruciani et al.'s original (2004) "delta cluster", which he had defined using Y-STR profiles. With the discovery of the defining SNP, Cruciani et al. (2007) reported that V12* was found in its highest concentrations in Egypt, especially Southern Egypt. Hassan et al. (2008) report a significant presence of E-V12* in neighboring Sudan, including 5/33 Copts and 5/39 Nubians. E-V12* made up approximately 20% of the Sudanese E-M78. They propose that the E-V12 and E-V22 sub-clades of E-M78 might have been brought to Sudan from their place of origin in North Africa after the progressive desertification of the Sahara around 6,000–8,000 years ago. Sudden climate change might have forced several Neolithic cultures/people to migrate northward to the Mediterranean and southward to the Sahel and the Nile Valley. The E-V12* paragroup is also observed in Europe (e.g. amongst French Basques) and Eastern Anatolia (e.g. Erzurum Turks).

The non-basal subhaplogroup E1b1b-V12/E3b1a1 has been found at highest frequencies among various Afroasiatic-speaking populations in eastern Africa, including Garreh (74.1%), Gabra (58.6%), Wata (55.6%), Borana (50.0%), Sanye (41.7%), Beja (33.3%) and Rendille (29.0%).

==== Sub-clades of E-V12 ====
===== E-M224 =====
E-M224 has been found in Israel among Yemeni population (5%) and appears to be a minor subclade.

Its discovery was announced in Underhill et al. (2001) and Shen et al. (2004) found 1 out of their 20 Yemeni Israelis they tested. Cruciani et al. (2006) called M224 "rare and rather uninformative" and they found no exemplars.

===== E-V32 =====
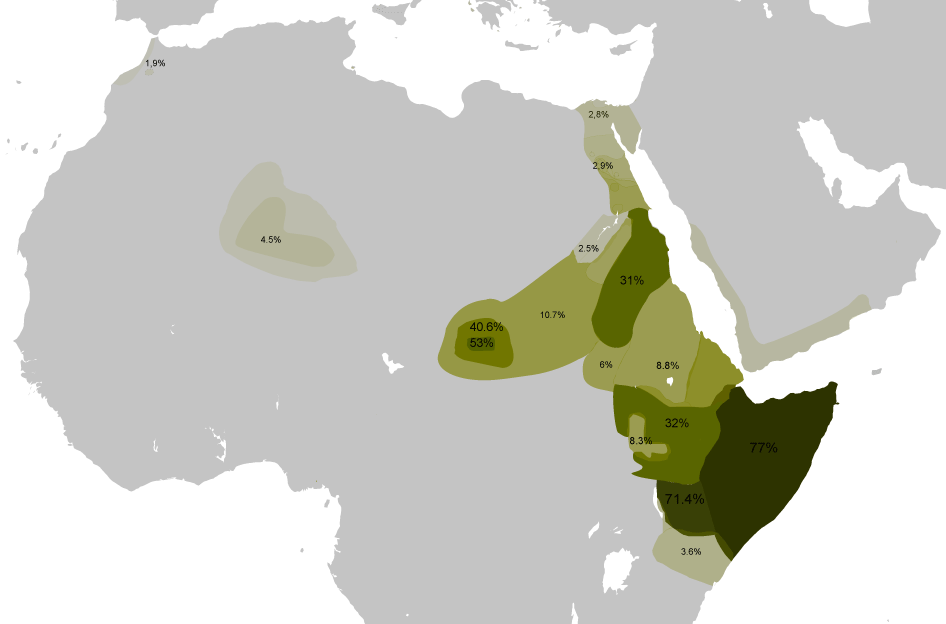
The distribution of V-32 in Africa

Cruciani et al. (2007) suggest that this subclade of E-V12 originated in North Africa, and then subsequently expanded further south into the Horn of Africa, where it is now prevalent. (Note: Cruciani et al. (2007): Fig. 2/C) Before the discovery of V32, Cruciani et al. (2004) referred to the same lineages as the "gamma cluster", which was estimated to have arisen about 8,500 years ago. They stated that "the highest frequencies in the three Cushitic-speaking groups: the Borana from Kenya (71.4%), the Oromo from Ethiopia (32.0%), and the Somali (52.2%). Outside of eastern Africa, it was found only in two subjects from Egypt (3.6%) and in one Arab from Morocco". Sanchez et al. (2005) found it extremely prominent in Somali men and stated that "the male Somali population is a branch of the Horn African population – closely related to the Oromos in Ethiopia and North Kenya (Boranas)" and that their gamma cluster lineages "probably were introduced into the Somali population 4000–5000 years ago". More recently, Tillmar et al. (2009) typed 147 males from Somalia for 12 Y-STR loci, and observed that 77% (113/147) had typical E-V32 haplotypes. This is currently the highest frequency of E-V32 found in any single sample population. Similarly, Hassan et al. (2008) in their study observed this to be the most common of the sub-clades of E-M78 found in Sudan, especially among the Beja, Masalit and Fur. The Beja, like Somalis and Oromos, speak an Afro-Asiatic language and live along the "corridor" from the Horn of Africa to Egypt. Hassan et al. (2008) interpret this as reinforcing the "strong correlation between linguistic and genetic diversity" and signs of relatedness between the Beja and the peoples of the Horn of Africa such as the Amhara and Oromo. On the other hand, the Masalit and Fur live in Darfur and speak a Nilo-Saharan language. The authors observed in their study that "the Masalit possesses by far the highest frequency of the E-M78 and of the E-V32 haplogroup", which they believe suggests "either a recent bottleneck in the population or a proximity to the origin of the haplogroup." However, More recently, Tillmar et al. (2009) typed 147 males from Somalia for 12 Y-STR loci, and observed that 77% (113/147) had typical E-V32 haplotypes. This is the highest frequency of E-V32 found in any single sample population.

The STR data from Cruciani et al. (2007) concerning E-V12 can be summarized as follows.

Haplotype	description	YCAIIa	YCAIIb	DYS413a	DYS413b	DYS19	DYS391	DYS393	DYS439	DYS460	DYS461	A10
E-V12*	modal	19	22	22	22	13	10	13	11	11	9	13
	min	18	21	20	21	11	10	12	11	8	8	11
	max	19	22	22	23	15	12	14	13	12	10	14
	number	40	40	40	40	40	40	40	40	40	40	40
E-V32	modal	19	21	22	23	11	10	13	12	10	10	13
	min	19	19	20	21	11	9	12	11	9	10	11
	max	20	22	22	24	11	11	13	13	12	11	14
	number	35	35	35	35	35	35	35	35	35	35	35
All E-V12	modal	19	22	22	23	11	10	13	11	11	10	13
	min	18	19	20	21	11	9	12	11	8	8	11
	max	20	22	22	24	15	12	14	13	12	11	14
	number	75	75	75	75	75	75	75	75	75	75	75

=== E-V13 ===
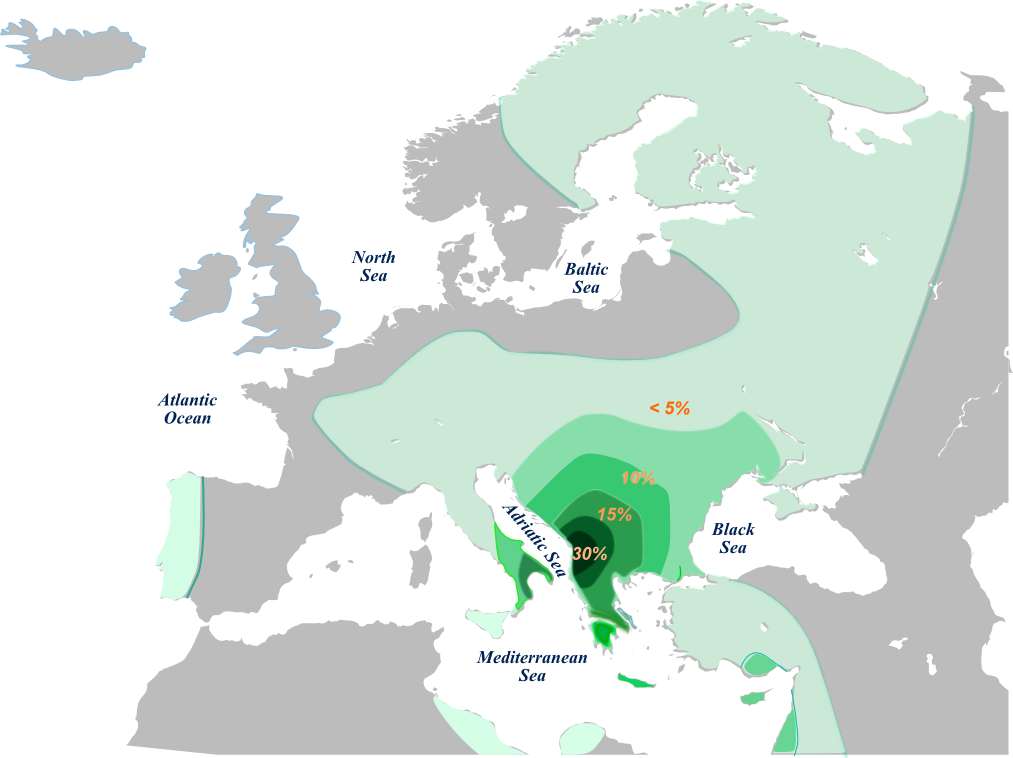
The distribution of E-V13 according to the dataset of Cruciani (2007) et al. listed above

The E-V13 clade is equivalent to the "alpha cluster" of E-M78 reported in Cruciani et al. (2004), and was first defined by the SNP V13 in Cruciani et al. (2006). Another SNP is known for this clade, V36, reported in Cruciani et al. (2007). All known positive tests for V13 are also positive for V36. So E-V13 is currently considered "phylogenetically equivalent" to E-V36.

Haplogroup E-V13 is the only lineage that reaches the highest frequencies out of Africa. In fact, it represents about 85% of the European E-M78 chromosomes with a clinal pattern of frequency distribution from the southern Balkan peninsula (19.6%) to western Europe (2.5%). The same haplogroup is also present at lower frequencies in Anatolia (3.8%), the Near East (2.0%), and the Caucasus (1.8%). In Africa, haplogroup E-V13 is rare, being observed only in northern Africa at a low frequency (0.9%).

— Cruciani et al. (2007)

Within Europe, E-V13 is especially common in the Balkans and some parts of Italy. In different studies, particularly high frequencies have been observed in Kosovo Albanians (45.6%), Macedonian Albanians (34.4%), Albanians (32.29%), and in some parts of Greece (ca. 35%). More generally, high frequencies have also been found in other areas of Greece, and amongst Bulgarians, Romanians, Macedonians and Serbs.

Within Italy, frequencies tend to be higher in Southern Italy, with particularly high results sometimes seen in particular areas; for example, in Santa Ninfa and Piazza Armerina in Sicily. High frequencies appear to exist also in some northern areas (Note: Genetic surveys do not all test the same markers.) for example around Venice, (Note: Scozzari et al. 2001. See clade 25.1. The same data set was later used in Cruciani et al. (2004) and Cruciani et al. (2007).) Genoa and Rimini, as well as on the island of Corsica and the region of Provence in south France, and is also found in scattered and small amounts in Libyan Jews and Egypt, but this is most likely a result of migration from Europe or the Near East.

==== E-V13 and ancient migrations ====
The apparent movement of E-M78 lineages from the Near East to Europe, and their subsequent rapid expansion, make its E-V13 subclade a particularly interesting subject for speculation about ancient human migrations.

It was concluded that northeastern Africa, rather than eastern Africa, was where the E-M78 chromosomes began dispersing to other regions. The most plausible scenario is that E-V13 originated in Western Asia. A hypothesis is that E-M78 carriers devoid of V13 mutation left Africa and that the coalescence occurred later in the Near East/Anatolia. Data suggests that Western Asian carriers of V13 expanded in Europe at earliest 5300 years ago. The TMRCA of European V13 is 4700–4000 years ago. Phylogenetic analysis suggest that the European v13 spread through Europe from the Balkans in a "rapid demographic expansion".

Before then, the SNP mutation, V13 apparently first arose in West Asia around 10 thousand years ago, and although not widespread there, it is for example found in high levels (>10% of the male population) in Turkish Cypriot and Druze Arab lineages. The Druze are considered a genetically isolated community, and are therefore of particular interest. The STR DNA signature of some of the E-V13 men amongst them was actually originally classified in the delta cluster in Cruciani et al. (2004). This means that Druze E-V13 clustered together with most E-V12 and E-V22, and not with European E-V13, which was mostly in the alpha cluster.

haplotype	description	YCAIIa	YCAIIb	DYS413a	DYS413b	DYS19	DYS391	DYS393	DYS439	DYS460	DYS461	A10
All E-V13	modal	19	21	23	24	13	10	13	12	9	10	13
Druze V13	1	19	21	23	23	13	10	13	13	11	9	12
Druze V13	2	19	21	23	23	13	10	13	13	11	9	13
All E-V22	modal	19	22	22	23	14	10	13	12	11	10	12
All E-V12*	modal	19	22	22	22	13	10	13	11	11	9	13

===== Early migration from the Middle East to Europe =====
The distribution and diversity of V13 are often thought to represent the introduction of early farming technologies, during the Neolithic expansion, into Europe by way of the Balkans. The haplogroup J2b (J-M12) has also frequently been discussed in connection with V13, as a haplogroup with a seemingly very similar distribution and pre-history. (There is no consensus regarding the circumstances or timing of its evolution.)

Cruciani et al. (2007) says there were at least four major demographic events which have been envisioned for this geographic area:

- The "post-Last Glacial Maximum expansion (about 20 kya)"
- The "Younger Dryas-Holocene reexpansion (about 12 kya)"
- The "population growth associated with the introduction of agricultural practices (about 8 kya)"
- The "development of Bronze technology (about 5kya)"

The last two seem within the timespan possible for V13 given its STR age of arise putatively in the Middle East. In favor of the agricultural connection, human remains excavated in a Spanish funeral cave dating from approximately 7000 years ago were shown to be in this haplogroup.

However, earlier entry into Europe is also possible. Battaglia et al. (2008), for example, propose that the E-M78* lineage ancestral to all modern E-V13 men moved rapidly out of a Southern Egyptian homeland, in the wetter conditions of the early Holocene; arrived in the Balkans with only Mesolithic technologies and then only subsequently integrated with Neolithic cultures which arrived later in the Balkans.

E-V13 is in any case often described in population genetics as one of the components of the European genetic composition which shows a relatively recent link of populations from the Middle East, entering Europe and presumably associated with bringing new technologies. As such, it is also sometimes remarked that it is a relatively recent genetic movement out of Africa into Eurasia, and has been described as "a signal for a separate late-Pleistocene migration from Africa to Europe over the Sinai ... which is not manifested in mtDNA haplogroup distributions".

After its initial entry in Europe, there was then a dispersal from the Balkans into the rest of Europe. Also for this movement, a wide range of possibilities exists. Battaglia et al. (2008) suggest that the E-V13 subclade of E-M78 originated in situ in Europe, and propose that the first major dispersal of E-V13 from the Balkans may have been in the direction of the Adriatic Sea with the Neolithic Impressed Ware culture often referred to as Impressa or Cardial. The above-mentioned find of archaic E-V13 in Spain supports this suggestion.

In contrast, Cruciani et al. (2007) suggest that the movement out of the Balkans may have been more recent than 5300 years ago. The authors suggest that for the most part, modern E-V13 descends from a population which remained in the Balkans until the Balkan Bronze Age. They consider that "the dispersion of the E-V13 and J-M12 haplogroups seems to have mainly followed the river waterways connecting the southern Balkans to north-central Europe". Peričic et al. (2005) propose the Vardar-Morava-Danube rivers as a possible route of Neolithic dispersal into central Europe. Bird (2007) proposes a still more recent dispersal out of the Balkans, around the time of the Roman empire.

According to Lacan et al. (2011), Neolithic skeletons (~7,000 years old) that were excavated from the Avellaner cave in Catalonia, northeastern Spain included a male specimen, which carried haplogroup E1b1b. This fossil belonged to the E1b1b1a1b (V13) subclade, and possessed identical haplotypes as found in modern European individuals (five Albanians, two Provence French, two Corsicans, two Bosnians, one Italian, one Sicilian, and one Greek). The presence of this haplogroup in Neolithic Spain suggests that it is associated with the Neolithic agricultural package. The ancient farmer also bore the U5 mtDNA clade, an early European maternal haplogroup. His autosomal STR markers were likewise most typical of Europe. Additionally, the specimen was homozygous C/C for the LP-13910-C/T lactase persistence SNP, indicating that he was lactose intolerant.

Loosdrecht et al. (2018) found one skeleton, at the Grotte des Pigeons near Taforalt in eastern Morocco, which carried haplogroup E1b1b1a1b1 predecessor to EV13. The skeleton has been directly dated to between 15,100 and 13,900 calibrated years before present. Martiniano et al. (2022) later reassigned all the Taforalt samples to haplogroup E-M78 and none to E-L618, the predecessor to EV13. Fernandes et al. (2016) and Lipson et al. (2017) detected haplogroup E-L618 in two individuals from Hungary and Croatia ascribed to the Lengyel culture.

==== Greek soldiers in Pakistan ====
Both E-M78 and J-M12 have also been used in studies seeking to find evidence of a remaining Greek presence in Afghanistan and Pakistan, going back to the time of Alexander the Great.

An extensive analysis of Y diversity within Greeks and three Pakistani populations – the Burusho, Kalash and Pathan – who claim descent from Greek soldiers allowed us to compare Y lineages within these populations and re-evaluate their suggested Greek origins. This study as a whole seems to exclude a large Greek contribution to any Pakistani population, confirming previous observations. However, it provides strong evidence in support of the Greek origins for a small proportion of Pathans, as demonstrated by the clade E network and the low pairwise genetic distances between these two populations.

— Firasat et al. (2006)

This study however tested only for M78, and not V13, the typical type of M78 from the Balkans. More recent and detailed analyses of E-V13 in this region have however concluded that this hypothesis is incorrect, and that the variants found there are not the types typical of the Balkans. Instead "Afghanistan's lineages are correlated with Middle Easterners and Iranians but not with populations from the Balkans"

==== Ancient Britain ====
Significant frequencies of E-V13 have also been observed in towns in Wales, around Chester (ancient Deva Victrix) in England, and Scotland. The old trading town of Abergele on the northern coast of Wales in particular showed 7 out of 18 local people tested were in this lineage (approximately 40%), as reported in Weale et al. (2002).

Some scholars (e.g. Bird (2007) have attributed the presence of E-V13 in Great Britain, especially in areas of high frequency, to Roman settlement during the 1st through 4th centuries CE. The Roman Army included men of Balkan ancestry, including Thracians, Illyrians and Dacians. In particular, Steven Bird proposes a connection to a modern region encompassing Kosovo, southern Serbia, northern Macedonia, and extreme northwestern Bulgaria – a region corresponding to the Roman province of Moesia Superior, which was identified by Peričic et al. (2005) as harboring the highest frequency worldwide of this subclade. (Note: Doubts about this line of reasoning have been expressed because: (a.) new data appearing in King et al. (2008) indicates that there were also high concentrations of E-V13 in Greece and (b.) the data in Peričic et al. (2005) show that the area with the highest frequency does not have the highest diversity, implying that V13 arrived there more recently than in Greece.)

It is also notable that E-V13 appears to be absent in modern central England, especially the West Midlands and South Midlands. (Note: Bird uses three sources: Weale et al. (2002), Capelli et al. (2003) and Sykes (2006). Neither Capelli nor Weale have data from the area in the English Midlands where Bird suggests that there is a lack of E1b1b [editor E-M243]. In 2006 Bird mentioned that there were 193 Central English haplotypes in Sykes.) Bird (2007) notes that the collective genetic profile of the English Midlands is similar to that of the Dutch province of Friesland, which was not colonised by Rome, but was, like England, subject to Anglo-Saxon settlement. The so-called "E3b hole" in Central England, according to Steven Bird, may reflect a population replacement – of Romano-British people by Anglo-Saxons. (Note: However, in the E3b distribution maps published in Bird's own paper – the Norfolk area is shown as having a high percentage of E3b. Norfolk is part of the epicentre of the supposed Anglian invasion.) Thomas et al. (2006) raises the possibility of "apartheid"-type, elite dominance social structures in Anglo-Saxon England. Bird (2007) concurs: "The 'E3b hole' suggests that either (a) a massive displacement of the ... Romano-British population by invasion or, (b) the substantial genetic replacement of Romano-British Y-DNA through an elite dominance ("apartheid") model... Regardless of the mechanism, the Central England region ... with its lack of E3b haplotypes, is the area having the most "striking similarity in the distribution of Y-chromosomes" with Friesland."

==== Sub-clades of E-V13 ====
Although most E-V13 individuals do not show any known downstream SNP mutations, and are therefore categorized as E-V13* there are several recognized sub-clades, all of which may be very small. These are one of two cases where Karafet et al. (2008) remarked that at the time of that article, it was not certain that the two clades were truly separate ("the positions of these mutations have not been resolved because of a lack of a DNA sample containing the derived state at V27").

- E-V27. Defined by V27. Cruciani et al. (2007) found one case in Sicily.
- E-P65. Defined by P65.
- E-L17. Defined by L17.
- E-L143. Defined by L143.
- E-M35.2. Defined by M35.2.
- E-L241. Defined by L241.
- E-L250. Defined by L250, L251, and L252.

=== E-V22 ===
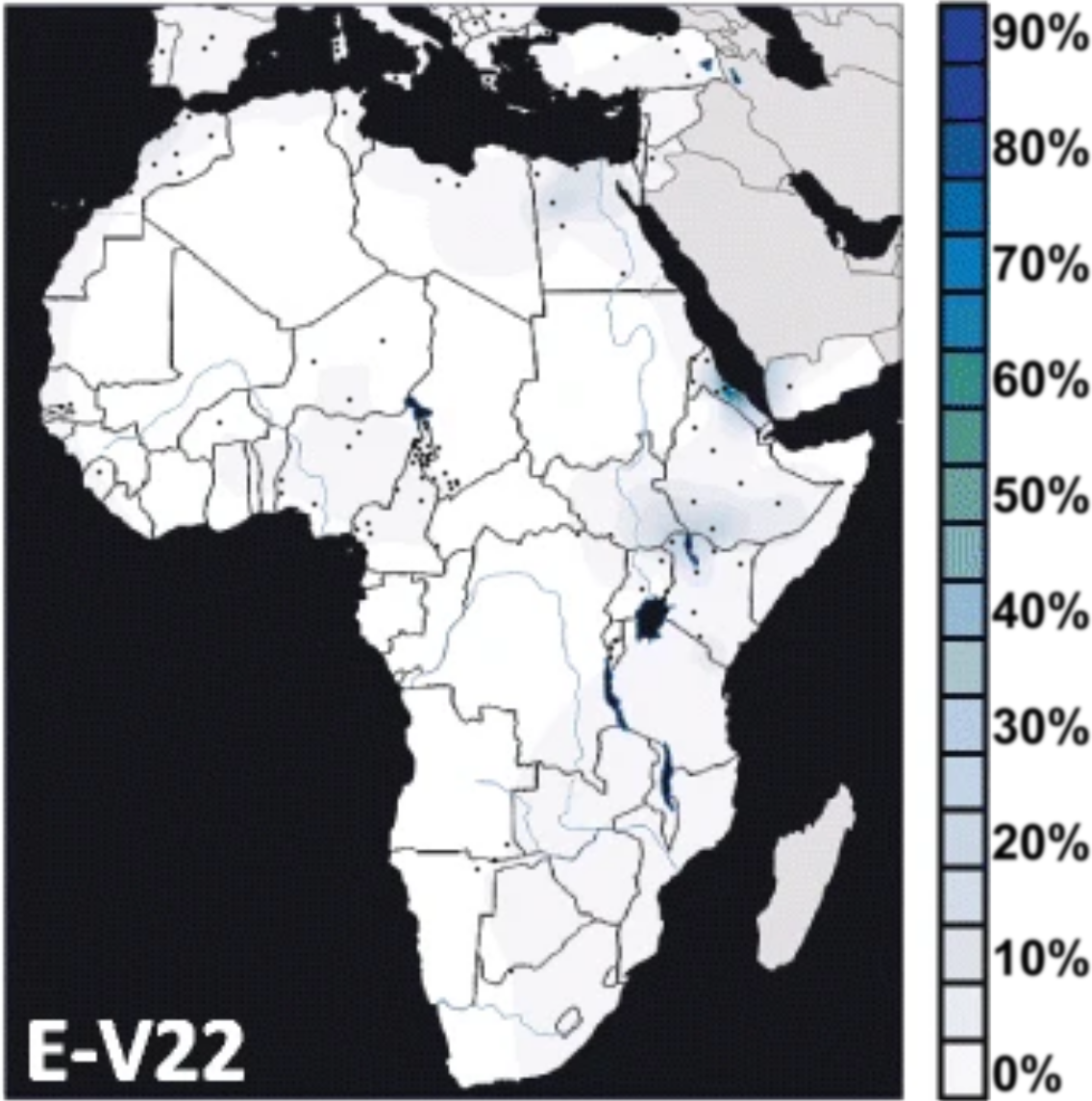
Interpolated frequency distribution of haplogroup E-V22.

This clade comprises most of those classified in the "delta cluster" of Cruciani et al. (2004). Cruciani et al. (2006) later noted that "E-V22 and E-V12* chromosomes are intermingled and not clearly differentiated by their microsatellite haplotypes".

The highest frequency of E-V22 has thus far been observed among the Samaritan Levites at 100% frequency,

Other frequencies reported by Cruciani et al. (2007) include Moroccan Arabs (7.27%, 55 people), Palestinians (6.9% out of 29 people). Cadenas et al. (2007) found a 7% presence in the UAE.

==== Sub-clades of E-V22 ====
There are two recognized sub-clades, which are apparently separate, although Karafet et al. (2008) remarked that at the time of that article, "the positions of these mutations have not been resolved because of a lack of a DNA sample containing the derived state at [...] V19".

- E-M148 Defined by M148. Underhill et al. (2000) found 1 example in the Indian subcontinent. Cruciani et al. (2006) calls M148 "rare and rather uninformative".
- E-V19 Defined by V19. Cruciani et al. (2007) found 2 exemplars in Sardinia.

=== E-V65 ===
This subclade, equivalent to the previously classified "beta cluster", is found in high levels in the Maghreb regions of far northern Africa. Cruciani et al. (2007) report levels of about 20% amongst Libyan Arab lineages, and about 30% amongst Moroccan Arabs. It appears to be less common amongst Berbers, but still present in levels of >10%. The authors suggest a North African origin for this lineage. In Europe, only a few individuals were found in Italy and Greece. The results from the article can be summarized as follows...

E-V65	YCAIIa	YCAIIb	DYS413a	DYS413b	DYS19	DYS391	DYS393	DYS439	DYS460	DYS461	A10
modal	19	21	21	23	13	10	13	10	10	11	13
min	19	20	20	22	11	10	13	10	9	9	12
max	21	21	22	23	14	11	14	11	11	12	13
number	38	38	38	38	38	38	38	38	38	38	38

Capelli et al. (2009) studied the beta cluster in Europe. They found small amounts in Southern Italy, but also traces in Cantabria, Portugal and Galicia, with Cantabria having the highest level in Europe in their study, at 3.1% (5 out of 161 people). Next to Cantabria, Rodriguez et al. (2021) found high frequencies of E-V65 among Basque autochthonous inhabitants of Alava province (17.3%), Vizcaya province (10.9%), and Guipuzcoa province (3.3%).

=== E-M521 ===
This subclade's discovery was announced in Battaglia et al. (2008) They found 2 out of 92 Greeks to have this mutation.

== Phylogenetics ==
=== Phylogenetic history ===
Prior to 2002, there were in academic literature at least seven naming systems for the Y-Chromosome Phylogenetic tree. This led to considerable confusion. In 2002, the major research groups came together and formed the Y-Chromosome Consortium (YCC). They published a joint paper that created a single new tree that all agreed to use. Later, a group of citizen scientists with an interest in population genetics and genetic genealogy formed a working group to create an amateur tree aiming at being above all timely. The table below brings together all of these works at the point of the landmark 2002 YCC Tree. This allows a researcher reviewing older published literature to move quickly between nomenclatures.

YCC 2002/2008 (Shorthand)	(α)	(β)	(γ)	(δ)	(ε)	(ζ)	(η)	YCC 2002	YCC 2005	YCC 2008	YCC 2010r	ISOGG						
YCC 2002/2008 (Shorthand)	(α)	(β)	(γ)	(δ)	(ε)	(ζ)	(η)	(Longhand)				2006	2007	2008	2009	2010	2011	2012
E-P29	21	III	3A	13	Eu3	H2	B	E*	E	E	E	E	E	E	E	E	E	E
E-M33	21	III	3A	13	Eu3	H2	B	E1*	E1	E1a	E1a	E1	E1	E1a	E1a	E1a	E1a	E1a
E-M44	21	III	3A	13	Eu3	H2	B	E1a	E1a	E1a1	E1a1	E1a	E1a	E1a1	E1a1	E1a1	E1a1	E1a1
E-M75	21	III	3A	13	Eu3	H2	B	E2a	E2	E2	E2	E2	E2	E2	E2	E2	E2	E2
E-M54	21	III	3A	13	Eu3	H2	B	E2b	E2b	E2b	E2b1	-	-	-	-	-	-	-
E-P2	25	III	4	14	Eu3	H2	B	E3*	E3	E1b	E1b1	E3	E3	E1b1	E1b1	E1b1	E1b1	E1b1
E-M2	8	III	5	15	Eu2	H2	B	E3a*	E3a	E1b1	E1b1a	E3a	E3a	E1b1a	E1b1a	E1b1a	E1b1a1	E1b1a1
E-M58	8	III	5	15	Eu2	H2	B	E3a1	E3a1	E1b1a1	E1b1a1	E3a1	E3a1	E1b1a1	E1b1a1	E1b1a1	E1b1a1a1a	E1b1a1a1a
E-M116.2	8	III	5	15	Eu2	H2	B	E3a2	E3a2	E1b1a2	E1b1a2	E3a2	E3a2	E1b1a2	E1b1a2	E1ba12	removed	removed
E-M149	8	III	5	15	Eu2	H2	B	E3a3	E3a3	E1b1a3	E1b1a3	E3a3	E3a3	E1b1a3	E1b1a3	E1b1a3	E1b1a1a1c	E1b1a1a1c
E-M154	8	III	5	15	Eu2	H2	B	E3a4	E3a4	E1b1a4	E1b1a4	E3a4	E3a4	E1b1a4	E1b1a4	E1b1a4	E1b1a1a1g1c	E1b1a1a1g1c
E-M155	8	III	5	15	Eu2	H2	B	E3a5	E3a5	E1b1a5	E1b1a5	E3a5	E3a5	E1b1a5	E1b1a5	E1b1a5	E1b1a1a1d	E1b1a1a1d
E-M10	8	III	5	15	Eu2	H2	B	E3a6	E3a6	E1b1a6	E1b1a6	E3a6	E3a6	E1b1a6	E1b1a6	E1b1a6	E1b1a1a1e	E1b1a1a1e
E-M35	25	III	4	14	Eu4	H2	B	E3b*	E3b	E1b1b1	E1b1b1	E3b1	E3b1	E1b1b1	E1b1b1	E1b1b1	removed	removed
E-M78	25	III	4	14	Eu4	H2	B	E3b1*	E3b1	E1b1b1a	E1b1b1a1	E3b1a	E3b1a	E1b1b1a	E1b1b1a	E1b1b1a	E1b1b1a1	E1b1b1a1
E-M148	25	III	4	14	Eu4	H2	B	E3b1a	E3b1a	E1b1b1a3a	E1b1b1a1c1	E3b1a3a	E3b1a3a	E1b1b1a3a	E1b1b1a3a	E1b1b1a3a	E1b1b1a1c1	E1b1b1a1c1
E-M81	25	III	4	14	Eu4	H2	B	E3b2*	E3b2	E1b1b1b	E1b1b1b1	E3b1b	E3b1b	E1b1b1b	E1b1b1b	E1b1b1b	E1b1b1b1	E1b1b1b1a
E-M107	25	III	4	14	Eu4	H2	B	E3b2a	E3b2a	E1b1b1b1	E1b1b1b1a	E3b1b1	E3b1b1	E1b1b1b1	E1b1b1b1	E1b1b1b1	E1b1b1b1a	E1b1b1b1a1
E-M165	25	III	4	14	Eu4	H2	B	E3b2b	E3b2b	E1b1b1b2	E1b1b1b1b1	E3b1b2	E3b1b2	E1b1b1b2a	E1b1b1b2a	E1b1b1b2a	E1b1b1b2a	E1b1b1b1a2a
E-M123	25	III	4	14	Eu4	H2	B	E3b3*	E3b3	E1b1b1c	E1b1b1c	E3b1c	E3b1c	E1b1b1c	E1b1b1c	E1b1b1c	E1b1b1c	E1b1b1b2a
E-M34	25	III	4	14	Eu4	H2	B	E3b3a*	E3b3a	E1b1b1c1	E1b1b1c1	E3b1c1	E3b1c1	E1b1b1c1	E1b1b1c1	E1b1b1c1	E1b1b1c1	E1b1b1b2a1
E-M136	25	III	4	14	Eu4	H2	B	E3ba1	E3b3a1	E1b1b1c1a	E1b1b1c1a1	E3b1c1a	E3b1c1a	E1b1b1c1a1	E1b1b1c1a1	E1b1b1c1a1	E1b1b1c1a1	E1b1b1b2a1a1

==== Research publications ====
The following research teams per their publications were represented in the creation of the YCC tree.

- α Jobling and Tyler-Smith 2000 and Kaladjieva 2001
- β Underhill 2000
- γ Hammer 2001
- δ Karafet 2001
- ε Semino 2000
- ζ Su 1999
- η Capelli 2001

== See also ==
=== Genetics ===
- African admixture in Europe
- Genetic genealogy
- Haplogroup D (Y-DNA)
- Haplogroup DE (Y-DNA)
- Haplogroup
- Haplotype
- Human Y-chromosome DNA haplogroup
- Molecular phylogenetics
- Paragroup
- Subclade
- Y-chromosome haplogroups in populations of the world
- Y-DNA haplogroups by ethnic group
- Y-DNA haplogroups in populations of Sub-Saharan Africa

=== Y-DNA E subclades ===
- Haplogroup E-L485 (Y-DNA)
- Haplogroup E-M180 (Y-DNA)
- Haplogroup E-M33 (Y-DNA)
- Haplogroup E-M96 (Y-DNA)
- Haplogroup E-P147 (Y-DNA)
- Haplogroup E-P177 (Y-DNA)
- Haplogroup E-P2 (Y-DNA)
- Haplogroup E-V12 (Y-DNA)
- Haplogroup E-V13 (Y-DNA)
- Haplogroup E-V22 (Y-DNA)
- Haplogroup E-V65 (Y-DNA)
- Haplogroup E-V38 (Y-DNA)
- Haplogroup E-M215 (Y-DNA)
- Haplogroup E-M123 (Y-DNA)
- Haplogroup E-M75 (Y-DNA)
- Haplogroup E-V68 (Y-DNA)
- Haplogroup E-Z820 (Y-DNA)
- Haplogroup E-Z827 (Y-DNA)
- Haplogroup E-M521 (Y-DNA)

== Notes ==
=== Sources for conversion tables ===
- Capelli, Cristian; Wilson, James F.; Richards, Martin; Stumpf, Michael P.H.; et al. (February 2001). "A Predominantly Indigenous Paternal Heritage for the Austronesian-Speaking Peoples of Insular Southeast Asia and Oceania". The American Journal of Human Genetics. 68 (2): 432–443. doi:10.1086/318205. PMC 1235276. PMID 11170891.
- Hammer, Michael F.; Karafet, Tatiana M.; Redd, Alan J.; Jarjanazi, Hamdi; et al. (1 July 2001). "Hierarchical Patterns of Global Human Y-Chromosome Diversity". Molecular Biology and Evolution. 18 (7): 1189–1203. doi:10.1093/oxfordjournals.molbev.a003906. PMID 11420360.
- Jobling, Mark A.; Tyler-Smith, Chris (2000), "New uses for new haplotypes", Trends in Genetics, 16 (8): 356–62, doi:10.1016/S0168-9525(00)02057-6, PMID 10904265
- Kaladjieva, Luba; Calafell, Francesc; Jobling, Mark A; Angelicheva, Dora; et al. (February 2001). "Patterns of inter- and intra-group genetic diversity in the Vlax Roma as revealed by Y chromosome and mitochondrial DNA lineages". European Journal of Human Genetics. 9 (2): 97–104. doi:10.1038/sj.ejhg.5200597. PMID 11313742. S2CID 21432405.
- Karafet, Tatiana; Xu, Liping; Du, Ruofu; Wang, William; et al. (September 2001). "Paternal Population History of East Asia: Sources, Patterns, and Microevolutionary Processes". The American Journal of Human Genetics. 69 (3): 615–628. Bibcode:2001AmJHG..69..615K. doi:10.1086/323299. PMC 1235490. PMID 11481588.
- Semino, O.; Passarino, G; Oefner, PJ; Lin, AA; et al. (2000), "The Genetic Legacy of Paleolithic Homo sapiens sapiens in Extant Europeans: A Y Chromosome Perspective", Science, 290 (5494): 1155–9, Bibcode:2000Sci...290.1155S, doi:10.1126/science.290.5494.1155, PMID 11073453
- Su, Bing; Xiao, Junhua; Underhill, Peter; Deka, Ranjan; et al. (December 1999). "Y-Chromosome Evidence for a Northward Migration of Modern Humans into Eastern Asia during the Last Ice Age". The American Journal of Human Genetics. 65 (6): 1718–1724. Bibcode:1999AmJHG..65.1718S. doi:10.1086/302680. PMC 1288383. PMID 10577926.
- Underhill, Peter A.; Shen, Peidong; Lin, Alice A.; Jin, Li; et al. (November 2000). "Y chromosome sequence variation and the history of human populations". Nature Genetics. 26 (3): 358–361. doi:10.1038/81685. PMID 11062480. S2CID 12893406.
