= Goings =

Goings is a surname. Notable people with the surname include:

- Viola Tyler Goings (1899–1983), American educator
- Ralph Goings (1928–2016), American painter
- Rick Goings (born 1945), American businessman
- Calvin Goings (born 1973), American politician
- Nick Goings (born 1978), American football player
- Genevieve Goings, American musician

== See also ==
- Goins (surname)
