= Gowing =

Gowing is a surname. Notable people with the surname include:

- Eric Gowing (1913-1981), Anglican Bishop of Auckland
- John Gowing (1835–1908), English-born Australian retailer
- Laura Gowing (fl. 2003), British historian
- Sir Lawrence Gowing (1918-1991), British artist, writer, curator and teacher
- Margaret Gowing (1921–1998), English historian
- Nik Gowing (born 1951), British television journalist

== Other uses ==
- Gowing, a character in The Diary of a Nobody by George and Weedon Grossmith

== See also ==
- Gowings, department store chain in Sydney, Australia
- Going (disambiguation)
- Gowin
