= Going (surname) =

Going is a surname. Notable people with the surname include:

- Ben Going (born 1985), American video blog personality
- Charles Buxton Going (1863–1952), American engineer
- Joanna Going (born 1963), American actress
- John Going (1872–19??), American politician and member of the Mississippi House of Representatives
- KL Going (born 1973), American author
- Shaun Going, Canadian construction engineer charged with terrorism
- Sid Going (1943–2024), New Zealand rugby union footballer
