= Haplogroup E-V38 =

Human Y-chromosome DNA haplogroup

Haplogroup E-V38 (former E3a / E1b1a)
- Possible time of origin: 41,400 years BP
- Coalescence age: 39,200 years BP
- Possible place of origin: East Africa
- Ancestor: E-P2
- Descendants: E-M2, E-M329
- Defining mutations: L222.1, V38, V100

Haplogroup E-V38, also known as E1b1a-V38, is a major human Y-chromosome DNA haplogroup. E-V38 is primarily distributed in Africa. E-V38 has two basal branches, E-M329 and E-M2. (Note: E-M329 is formerly known as E1b1c and E1b1*) (Note: E-M2 is formerly known as E3a and E1b1a) E-M329 is a subclade mostly found in East Africa. E-M2 is the predominant subclade in West Africa, Central Africa, Southern Africa, and the region of African Great Lakes; it also occurs at low frequencies in North Africa, West Asia, and Southern Europe.

== Origins ==
The discovery of two SNPs (V38 and V100) by Trombetta et al. (2011) significantly redefined the E-V38 phylogenetic tree. This led the authors to suggest that E-V38 may have originated in East Africa. V38 joins the West African-affiliated E-M2 and the Northeast African-affiliated E-M329 with an earlier common ancestor who, like E-P2, may have also originated in East Africa. According to Wood et al. (2005) and Rosa et al. (2007), such population movements changed the pre-existing population Y chromosomal diversity in Central, Southern, and Southeastern Africa, replacing the previous haplogroup frequencies (haplogroups A and B-M60) in these areas with the now dominant E1b1a1 lineages. Traces of earlier inhabitants, however, can be observed today in these regions via the presence of the Y DNA haplogroups A1a, A1b, A2, A3, and B-M60 that are common in certain populations, such as the Mbuti and Khoisan. Shriner et al. (2018) similarly suggests that haplogroup E1b1a-V38 traversed across the Green Sahara from east to west around 19,000 years ago, where E1b1a1-M2 may have subsequently originated in West Africa or Central Africa. Shriner et al. (2018) also traces this movement via sickle cell mutation, which likely originated during the Green Sahara period.

== Ancient DNA ==
Gad et al. (2021) indicates that the ancient Egyptian mummies of Ramesses III and Unknown Man E, possibly Pentawere, carried haplogroup E1b1a, which appears at its highest frequency rates in Central Africa at ~60% and in West Africa at ~80%.

During the 18th Dynasty of Ancient Egypt, some mummies from the Amarna Period carried haplogroups E1b1a and L.

At Cabeço da Amoreira, in Portugal, an enslaved West African man, who may have been from the Senegambian coastal region of Gambia, Mauritania, or Senegal, and carried haplogroups E1b1a and L3b1a, was buried among shell middens between the 16th century CE and the 18th century CE.

== Distribution ==
E-V38's frequency and diversity are highest in West Africa. Within Africa, E-V38 displays a west-to-east as well as a south-to-north clinal distribution. In other words, the frequency of the haplogroup decreases as one moves from western and southern Africa toward the eastern and northern parts of Africa.

== Subclades ==
=== E-M2 ===
E1b1a1 is defined by markers DYS271/M2/SY81, M291, P1/PN1, P189, P293, V43, and V95. E-M2 is a diverse haplogroup with many branches.

=== E-M329 ===
E1b1a2 is defined by the SNP mutation M329. (Note: E-M329 is formerly known as E1b1c.) E-M329 is mostly found in East Africa. E-M329 is also frequent in Southwestern Ethiopia, especially among Omotic-speaking populations.

== Phylogenetics ==
=== Phylogenetic history ===
Prior to 2002, there were in academic literature at least seven naming systems for the Y-Chromosome Phylogenetic tree. This led to considerable confusion. In 2002, the major research groups came together and formed the Y-Chromosome Consortium (YCC). They published a joint paper that created a single new tree that all agreed to use. Later, a group of citizen scientists with an interest in population genetics and genetic genealogy formed a working group to create an amateur tree aiming at being above all timely. The table below brings together all of these works at the point of the landmark 2002 YCC Tree. This allows a researcher reviewing older published literature to quickly move between nomenclatures.

YCC 2002/2008 (Shorthand)	(α)	(β)	(γ)	(δ)	(ε)	(ζ)	(η)	YCC 2002 (Longhand)	YCC 2005 (Longhand)	YCC 2008 (Longhand)	YCC 2010r (Longhand)	ISOGG 2006	ISOGG 2007	ISOGG 2008	ISOGG 2009	ISOGG 2010	ISOGG 2011	ISOGG 2012
E-P29	21	III	3A	13	Eu3	H2	B	E*	E	E	E	E	E	E	E	E	E	E
E-M33	21	III	3A	13	Eu3	H2	B	E1*	E1	E1a	E1a	E1	E1	E1a	E1a	E1a	E1a	E1a
E-M44	21	III	3A	13	Eu3	H2	B	E1a	E1a	E1a1	E1a1	E1a	E1a	E1a1	E1a1	E1a1	E1a1	E1a1
E-M75	21	III	3A	13	Eu3	H2	B	E2a	E2	E2	E2	E2	E2	E2	E2	E2	E2	E2
E-M54	21	III	3A	13	Eu3	H2	B	E2b	E2b	E2b	E2b1	-	-	-	-	-	-	-
E-P2	25	III	4	14	Eu3	H2	B	E3*	E3	E1b	E1b1	E3	E3	E1b1	E1b1	E1b1	E1b1	E1b1
E-M2	8	III	5	15	Eu2	H2	B	E3a*	E3a	E1b1	E1b1a	E3a	E3a	E1b1a	E1b1a	E1b1a	E1b1a1	E1b1a1
E-M58	8	III	5	15	Eu2	H2	B	E3a1	E3a1	E1b1a1	E1b1a1	E3a1	E3a1	E1b1a1	E1b1a1	E1b1a1	E1b1a1a1a	E1b1a1a1a
E-M116.2	8	III	5	15	Eu2	H2	B	E3a2	E3a2	E1b1a2	E1b1a2	E3a2	E3a2	E1b1a2	E1b1a2	E1ba12	removed	removed
E-M149	8	III	5	15	Eu2	H2	B	E3a3	E3a3	E1b1a3	E1b1a3	E3a3	E3a3	E1b1a3	E1b1a3	E1b1a3	E1b1a1a1c	E1b1a1a1c
E-M154	8	III	5	15	Eu2	H2	B	E3a4	E3a4	E1b1a4	E1b1a4	E3a4	E3a4	E1b1a4	E1b1a4	E1b1a4	E1b1a1a1g1c	E1b1a1a1g1c
E-M155	8	III	5	15	Eu2	H2	B	E3a5	E3a5	E1b1a5	E1b1a5	E3a5	E3a5	E1b1a5	E1b1a5	E1b1a5	E1b1a1a1d	E1b1a1a1d
E-M10	8	III	5	15	Eu2	H2	B	E3a6	E3a6	E1b1a6	E1b1a6	E3a6	E3a6	E1b1a6	E1b1a6	E1b1a6	E1b1a1a1e	E1b1a1a1e
E-M35	25	III	4	14	Eu4	H2	B	E3b*	E3b	E1b1b1	E1b1b1	E3b1	E3b1	E1b1b1	E1b1b1	E1b1b1	removed	removed
E-M78	25	III	4	14	Eu4	H2	B	E3b1*	E3b1	E1b1b1a	E1b1b1a1	E3b1a	E3b1a	E1b1b1a	E1b1b1a	E1b1b1a	E1b1b1a1	E1b1b1a1
E-M148	25	III	4	14	Eu4	H2	B	E3b1a	E3b1a	E1b1b1a3a	E1b1b1a1c1	E3b1a3a	E3b1a3a	E1b1b1a3a	E1b1b1a3a	E1b1b1a3a	E1b1b1a1c1	E1b1b1a1c1
E-M81	25	III	4	14	Eu4	H2	B	E3b2*	E3b2	E1b1b1b	E1b1b1b1	E3b1b	E3b1b	E1b1b1b	E1b1b1b	E1b1b1b	E1b1b1b1	E1b1b1b1a
E-M107	25	III	4	14	Eu4	H2	B	E3b2a	E3b2a	E1b1b1b1	E1b1b1b1a	E3b1b1	E3b1b1	E1b1b1b1	E1b1b1b1	E1b1b1b1	E1b1b1b1a	E1b1b1b1a1
E-M165	25	III	4	14	Eu4	H2	B	E3b2b	E3b2b	E1b1b1b2	E1b1b1b1b1	E3b1b2	E3b1b2	E1b1b1b2a	E1b1b1b2a	E1b1b1b2a	E1b1b1b2a	E1b1b1b1a2a
E-M123	25	III	4	14	Eu4	H2	B	E3b3*	E3b3	E1b1b1c	E1b1b1c	E3b1c	E3b1c	E1b1b1c	E1b1b1c	E1b1b1c	E1b1b1c	E1b1b1b2a
E-M34	25	III	4	14	Eu4	H2	B	E3b3a*	E3b3a	E1b1b1c1	E1b1b1c1	E3b1c1	E3b1c1	E1b1b1c1	E1b1b1c1	E1b1b1c1	E1b1b1c1	E1b1b1b2a1
E-M136	25	III	4	14	Eu4	H2	B	E3ba1	E3b3a1	E1b1b1c1a	E1b1b1c1a1	E3b1c1a	E3b1c1a	E1b1b1c1a1	E1b1b1c1a1	E1b1b1c1a1	E1b1b1c1a1	E1b1b1b2a1a1

==== Research publications ====
The following research teams per their publications were represented in the creation of the YCC tree.

- α Jobling and Tyler-Smith 2000 and Kaladjieva 2001
- β Underhill 2000
- γ Hammer 2001
- δ Karafet 2001
- ε Semino 2000
- ζ Su 1999
- η Capelli 2001

=== Phylogenetic trees ===
This phylogenetic tree of haplogroup subclades is based on the Y-Chromosome Consortium (YCC) 2008 Tree, the ISOGG Y-DNA Haplogroup E Tree, and subsequent published research.

- E1b1a (L222.1, V38, V100)
  - E1b1a1 (DYS271/M2/SY81, M291, P1/PN1, P189, P293, V43, V95, Z1101, Z1107, Z1116, Z1120, Z1122, Z1123, Z1124, Z1125, Z1127, Z1130, Z1133)
  - E1b1a2 (M329)

== See also ==
=== Genetics ===
- African admixture in Europe
- Genetic genealogy
- Haplogroup D
- Haplogroup DE
- Haplogroup
- Haplotype
- Human Y-chromosome DNA haplogroup
- Molecular phylogenetics
- Paragroup
- Subclade
- Y-chromosome haplogroups in populations of the world
- Y-DNA haplogroups by ethnic group
- Y-DNA haplogroups in populations of Sub-Saharan Africa

=== Y-DNA E subclades ===
- Haplogroup E-L485
- Haplogroup E-M123
- Haplogroup E-M180
- Haplogroup E-M215
- Haplogroup E-M33
- Haplogroup E-M521
- Haplogroup E-M75
- Haplogroup E-M96
- Haplogroup E-P147
- Haplogroup E-P177
- Haplogroup E-P2
- Haplogroup E-V12
- Haplogroup E-V13
- Haplogroup E-V22
- Haplogroup E-V38
- Haplogroup E-M2
- Haplogroup E-V65
- Haplogroup E-V68
- Haplogroup E-Z820
- Haplogroup E-Z827
