= Michele Goins =

Chief information officer and senior vice president of Juniper Networks

- Title: Chief information officer and Senior Vice President, Juniper Networks.
- Predecessor: Alan Boehme
- Successor: Incumbent

Michele E. Goins was the chief information officer and senior vice president of Juniper Networks, a multinational networking products company.

== Early life and education ==
Goins holds a B.S.C.S. degree in electrical engineering from Santa Clara University and earned an M.B.A. from Northeastern University — Graduate School of Business Administration . She has been recognized as one of the top 50 Hispanics in business and technology by several Hispanic magazines, including Hispanic Engineer & Information Technology in 2003 and Hispanic Business in 2008.

== Career ==
Goins was the vice president and CIO for the $30 billion-a-year division, Imaging and Printing Group (IPG) at Hewlett Packard (HP), where she served in a number of executive positions during her 25-year tenure. At HP, she provided services including information technology, acquisition integration, manufacturing, sales, marketing, and engineering.

In 2008, Goins replaced Alan Boehme, who was seriously injured in a car accident in February 2007, as the chief information officer of Juniper Networks.
