= Lorraine McGowen =

American lawyer

Lorraine S. McGowen is an American lawyer. She is a restructuring partner at Orrick, Herrington & Sutcliffe in the New York office. McGowen works with financial institutions, lender groups and creditor committees who want to maximize recoveries in complicated bankruptcies, out-of-court restructurings and rights controversies. She also works with investors and acquirers of distressed companies. McGowen is a fellow of the American Bar Foundation.

== Education ==
McGowen graduated from Georgetown University School of Foreign Service with a B.S.F.S. She received her J.D. degree from Columbia Law School.

== Career ==
McGowen joined Orrick in May, 1993, and became a partner in January, 1996. Since that time, she has advised financial institutions, syndicated lender groups and creditor committees from the U.S., Europe, Asia and Africa who seek to maximize their recovery or reduce their exposure. She develops mediation and litigation strategies and negotiates reorganization plans. McGowen has been involved in many prominent bankruptcy and out-of-court restructuring matters including Indiana Toll Road, Puerto Rico, South Bay Expressway, Lehman Brothers and Tronox. She co-lead's Orrick's Automotive Technology & Mobility group and serves on the firm's Management Committee.

McGowen is the lead bankruptcy attorney representing Toyota and its subsidiaries in the global restructuring of Takata Corporation and its subsidiaries.

=== Professional memberships ===
- American Bankruptcy Institute
- American Bar Association
- American College of Investment Counsel
- New York City Bar Association
- District of Columbia Bar
- Direct Women - whose mission is to increase the representation of women attorneys on corporate boards.

=== Boards ===
Board of Directors of the New York Lawyers for the Public Interest

Board of Directors - Institute for Inclusion in the Legal Profession

Board of Legal Advisers for Legal Outreach, a nonprofit program for college-bound students in disadvantaged New York City neighborhoods

Advisory Committee for the Vance Center for International Justice of the New York City Bar Association - Law Firm Members

Chair of Orrick's Diversity & Inclusion Initiatives and completed two terms on Orrick's 11-member Board of Directors

== Awards and honors ==
Recipient of the 2019 MCCA Rainmakers Award

McGowen is a fellow of the American Bar Foundation.

Savoy magazine named her in 2015 and 2018 among the Most Influential Black Lawyers.

Legal Outreach's Pipeline to Diversity Champion Award in 2017

IFLR1000 Rankings as a leading lawyer in the United States – Restructuring & Insolvency

== Personal life ==
McGowen currently resides in New Jersey with her husband, Gailon, and four children.
