= Jeff Goins =

American author, blogger and speaker

- Born: 1983; Chicago, Illinois
- Occupations: Author, speaker
- Writing career
- Language: English
- Notable work: The Art of Work
- Website: goinswriter.com

Jeff Goins is an American author, blogger, speaker. He is the founder of Tribe Writers, an online community for writers.

== Life and career ==
Goins is the former marketing director for Adventures in Missions, a Christian nonprofit organization, a position which he left to pursue a writing career. He is the author of four books including the national bestseller, The Art of Work, published in March 2015. The Art of Work debuted on the Washington Post and Publishers Weekly bestsellers list. Prior to The Art of Work, Goins published The In-Between: Embracing the Tension Between Now and the Next Big Thing, Wrecked: When a Broken World Slams into Your Comfortable Life, and You Are a Writer (So Start Acting Like One).

He most recently wrote Real Artists Don't Starve, a Wall Street Journal bestseller published by Thomas Nelson in June 2017.

Goins has written for Business Insider, Fast Company, the New York Observer, and others.

He resides with his wife, Chantel, in Nashville, Tennessee.
