= Shaun Going =

Shaun Going is a Canadian construction engineer who was arrested by Serbia in August 2000 and charged with terrorism. An acknowledged power broker with "enormous influence known to bribe and fraternise with other powerful figures in the region, including the Kosovo Liberation Army, he was quickly defended by Canada who insisted on his innocence.

== Life ==
Going grew up in a family of six children on a ranch near Longview, Alberta. He opened Going Real Estate, but following the collapse of the Soviet Union and the fall of communism across East Europe, he built a construction company named Meridian Resources based in Albania. He was contracted to build the local American embassy, as well as roads and sewers.

Due to his contacts in the country, Going became informally known as "the King of Albania" as he took advantage of the military strife to secure construction contracts, pay off officials and deal directly with both the government and rebel militants. He purchased a former headquarters of the Communist Party of Albania in Tirana, and hired security guards to patrol the grounds with AK-47s, and was frequently accompanied by them even when going into town. In 1997, the building came under attack by locals and was burned to the ground. Going fled to Sakhalin Island and worked in the petroleum industry.

== Arrest ==
Going returned to Kosovo on August 1, 1999. When the United Nations police raided Gani Thaci's house, they found C$375,000 in cash which he claimed was a bribe from Going, who denied the claim and said he'd only paid the KLA commander $90,000.

He was arrested, along with his 19-year-old nephew Liam Hall, and British police officers Adrian Prangnell, 41, and John Yore, 31, when a security check found blasting caps and wires in the back of their car. He was charged with training successionists to perform terrorist actions, but eventually released on bail as the charges were downgraded to "military spies". Minister of Foreign Affairs Lloyd Axworthy campaigned Serbia to release the two men.
