= Walter Goines =

American baseball player

- Pitcher

Negro league baseball debut
- 1932, for the Montgomery Grey Sox

Last appearance
- 1932, for the Montgomery Grey Sox

Teams
- Montgomery Grey Sox (1932)

Walter Goines is an American former Negro league pitcher who played in the 1930s.

Goines played for the Montgomery Grey Sox in 1932. He posted a 3.95 ERA over 13.2 innings in three recorded appearances on the mound.
