= Gowin =

Gowin is both a surname and a given name. Notable people with the name include:

Surname:

- Emmet Gowin (born 1941), photographer
- Jarosław Gowin (born 1961), politician
- Toby Gowin (born 1975), footballer

Given name:

- Gowin Knight (1713–1772), physicist

== See also ==
- Gawain, knight
- Gowing
