= Mistake fare =

Type of pricing error in the airline industry

A mistake fare or error fare is a type of pricing error used in respect to the airline industry. It occurs when an airline accidentally puts the wrong price for a ticket listing on their website. Multiple companies and individuals have formed businesses that revolve around informing their customer base when a mistake fare is posted.

== Concept ==
Mistake fares are a pricing error in the airline industry that occurs as a result of a mistake on the seller end. When searching for these, customers will generally not find any, and the ones they find will not necessarily be a place they want to go to. Mistake fares can wildly range in price, some going so low as to even be free. There are different types of mistake fares, one of which is nicknamed the "fat finger fare." It refers to data entry mistakes or a misplaced decimal point. Another one includes the ability to get a cheaper flight by paying in a different currency.

== Growth ==
Mistake fares have received coverage, both in concept and in execution, by numerous sources. These include The Telegraph, Los Angeles Times, and USA Today. In 2016, Los Angeles Times writer Terry Gardner stated that the social media website Twitter was the "new darling for travelers," due in part to the ease by which people could find mistake fares.

== Compliance ==
Mistake fares' capacity for working depends on the willingness of companies to comply with the mistake fares when they are made. Whether a mistake fare will be honored depends on the company as well as the laws and policies that a company has to adhere to. Federal regulations created certain restrictions to an airline's ability to refuse to honor mistake fares. There has been efforts to change regulations, including by the Department of Transportation in 2015. Such a change could pose a risk to the mistake fare industry if it allowed airlines to refuse such fares. However, the DOT also requires that airlines reimburse you for any non-refundable plans related to the ticket and your travel. In the past, consumers were largely opposed to the act of taking advantage of mistake fares; in more recent years however, they have become significantly more okay with this. USA Today writer Christopher Elliott noted the reason for this was that customers became more aware of certain practices done by airlines to, in the public perception, take as much money from consumers as possible. One argument on this situation is that the airlines employ a double standard. On one hand, branding consultant Talaya Waller argues that airlines take just as much advantage as consumers do, and are allowed to do so. On the other hand, website editor Kyle Stewart points out that a mistake made by the consumer is treated as the fault of the consumer's, but a mistake by an airline is not the fault of the airline. According to Skift writer Grant Martin, airlines go to lengths in order to prevent mistake fares from spreading. One tactic for this including monitoring public forums for posts about mistake fares. As Martin points out, the level of compliance a person may expect is based on the circumstances. For instance, some protections exist for standard flights with simple errors, while others - such as a mistake fare that was sold to residents of Denmark which required all buyers to claim that they lived in Denmark, do not.
