= Haplogroup E-P147 =

Human Y-chromosome DNA haplogroup

- Possible time of origin: 49,800 years BP
- Coalescence age: 49,800 years BP
- Possible place of origin: Africa
- Ancestor: E-M96
- Descendants: E-M132, E-P177
- Defining mutations: L504, L511, P147, PF1938

Haplogroup E-P147 is a human Y-chromosome DNA haplogroup. Haplogroup E-P147, along with the less common haplogroup E-M75, is one of the two main branches of the older haplogroup E-M96. The E-P147 clade is commonly observed throughout Africa and is divided into two subclades: the less common, haplogroup E-M132, and the more common, haplogroup E-P177.

== Distribution ==
E-P147 includes most of the subclades found in E-M96. The two branches of E-P147 have different distributions; while the less common branch, Haplogroup E-M132, has more of a distribution within West Africa, the more common branch, E-P177, can be found widely distributed with high frequency throughout Africa and to a lesser extent in the Middle East and Europe.

== Subclades ==
=== E-P177 ===
Haplogroup E-P177 is a subclade of haplogroup E-P147.

=== E-M132 ===
Haplogroup E-M132 is a subclade of haplogroup E-P147.

== Phylogenetics ==
=== Phylogenetic history ===
Prior to 2002, there were in academic literature at least seven naming systems for the Y-Chromosome Phylogenetic tree. This led to considerable confusion. In 2002, the major research groups came together and formed the Y-Chromosome Consortium (YCC). They published a joint paper that created a single new tree that all agreed to use. Later, a group of citizen scientists with an interest in population genetics and genetic genealogy formed a working group to create an amateur tree aiming at being above all timely. The table below brings together all of these works at the point of the landmark 2002 YCC Tree. This allows a researcher reviewing older published literature to quickly move between nomenclatures.

YCC 2002/2008 (Shorthand)	(α)	(β)	(γ)	(δ)	(ε)	(ζ)	(η)	YCC 2002 (Longhand)	YCC 2005 (Longhand)	YCC 2008 (Longhand)	YCC 2010r (Longhand)	ISOGG 2006	ISOGG 2007	ISOGG 2008	ISOGG 2009	ISOGG 2010	ISOGG 2011	ISOGG 2012
E-P29	21	III	3A	13	Eu3	H2	B	E*	E	E	E	E	E	E	E	E	E	E
E-M33	21	III	3A	13	Eu3	H2	B	E1*	E1	E1a	E1a	E1	E1	E1a	E1a	E1a	E1a	E1a
E-M44	21	III	3A	13	Eu3	H2	B	E1a	E1a	E1a1	E1a1	E1a	E1a	E1a1	E1a1	E1a1	E1a1	E1a1
E-M75	21	III	3A	13	Eu3	H2	B	E2a	E2	E2	E2	E2	E2	E2	E2	E2	E2	E2
E-M54	21	III	3A	13	Eu3	H2	B	E2b	E2b	E2b	E2b1	-	-	-	-	-	-	-
E-P2	25	III	4	14	Eu3	H2	B	E3*	E3	E1b	E1b1	E3	E3	E1b1	E1b1	E1b1	E1b1	E1b1
E-M2	8	III	5	15	Eu2	H2	B	E3a*	E3a	E1b1	E1b1a	E3a	E3a	E1b1a	E1b1a	E1b1a	E1b1a1	E1b1a1
E-M58	8	III	5	15	Eu2	H2	B	E3a1	E3a1	E1b1a1	E1b1a1	E3a1	E3a1	E1b1a1	E1b1a1	E1b1a1	E1b1a1a1a	E1b1a1a1a
E-M116.2	8	III	5	15	Eu2	H2	B	E3a2	E3a2	E1b1a2	E1b1a2	E3a2	E3a2	E1b1a2	E1b1a2	E1ba12	removed	removed
E-M149	8	III	5	15	Eu2	H2	B	E3a3	E3a3	E1b1a3	E1b1a3	E3a3	E3a3	E1b1a3	E1b1a3	E1b1a3	E1b1a1a1c	E1b1a1a1c
E-M154	8	III	5	15	Eu2	H2	B	E3a4	E3a4	E1b1a4	E1b1a4	E3a4	E3a4	E1b1a4	E1b1a4	E1b1a4	E1b1a1a1g1c	E1b1a1a1g1c
E-M155	8	III	5	15	Eu2	H2	B	E3a5	E3a5	E1b1a5	E1b1a5	E3a5	E3a5	E1b1a5	E1b1a5	E1b1a5	E1b1a1a1d	E1b1a1a1d
E-M10	8	III	5	15	Eu2	H2	B	E3a6	E3a6	E1b1a6	E1b1a6	E3a6	E3a6	E1b1a6	E1b1a6	E1b1a6	E1b1a1a1e	E1b1a1a1e
E-M35	25	III	4	14	Eu4	H2	B	E3b*	E3b	E1b1b1	E1b1b1	E3b1	E3b1	E1b1b1	E1b1b1	E1b1b1	removed	removed
E-M78	25	III	4	14	Eu4	H2	B	E3b1*	E3b1	E1b1b1a	E1b1b1a1	E3b1a	E3b1a	E1b1b1a	E1b1b1a	E1b1b1a	E1b1b1a1	E1b1b1a1
E-M148	25	III	4	14	Eu4	H2	B	E3b1a	E3b1a	E1b1b1a3a	E1b1b1a1c1	E3b1a3a	E3b1a3a	E1b1b1a3a	E1b1b1a3a	E1b1b1a3a	E1b1b1a1c1	E1b1b1a1c1
E-M81	25	III	4	14	Eu4	H2	B	E3b2*	E3b2	E1b1b1b	E1b1b1b1	E3b1b	E3b1b	E1b1b1b	E1b1b1b	E1b1b1b	E1b1b1b1	E1b1b1b1a
E-M107	25	III	4	14	Eu4	H2	B	E3b2a	E3b2a	E1b1b1b1	E1b1b1b1a	E3b1b1	E3b1b1	E1b1b1b1	E1b1b1b1	E1b1b1b1	E1b1b1b1a	E1b1b1b1a1
E-M165	25	III	4	14	Eu4	H2	B	E3b2b	E3b2b	E1b1b1b2	E1b1b1b1b1	E3b1b2	E3b1b2	E1b1b1b2a	E1b1b1b2a	E1b1b1b2a	E1b1b1b2a	E1b1b1b1a2a
E-M123	25	III	4	14	Eu4	H2	B	E3b3*	E3b3	E1b1b1c	E1b1b1c	E3b1c	E3b1c	E1b1b1c	E1b1b1c	E1b1b1c	E1b1b1c	E1b1b1b2a
E-M34	25	III	4	14	Eu4	H2	B	E3b3a*	E3b3a	E1b1b1c1	E1b1b1c1	E3b1c1	E3b1c1	E1b1b1c1	E1b1b1c1	E1b1b1c1	E1b1b1c1	E1b1b1b2a1
E-M136	25	III	4	14	Eu4	H2	B	E3ba1	E3b3a1	E1b1b1c1a	E1b1b1c1a1	E3b1c1a	E3b1c1a	E1b1b1c1a1	E1b1b1c1a1	E1b1b1c1a1	E1b1b1c1a1	E1b1b1b2a1a1

==== Research publications ====
The following research teams per their publications were represented in the creation of the YCC tree.

- α Jobling and Tyler-Smith 2000 and Kaladjieva 2001
- β Underhill 2000
- γ Hammer 2001
- δ Karafet 2001
- ε Semino 2000
- ζ Su 1999
- η Capelli 2001

=== Phylogenetic trees ===
- E (M96)
  - E1 (P147)
    - E1a (M132)
    - E1b1 (P2)
      - E1b1a (V38)
        - E1b1a1 (M2)
        - E1b1a2 (M329)
      - E1b1b (M215)
        - E1b1b1a (V68)
        - E1b1b1b (Z827)
  - E2 (M75)

== See also ==
=== Genetics ===
- African admixture in Europe
- Genetic genealogy
- Haplogroup D
- Haplogroup DE
- Haplogroup
- Haplotype
- Human Y-chromosome DNA haplogroup
- Molecular phylogenetics
- Paragroup
- Subclade
- Y-chromosome haplogroups in populations of the world
- Y-DNA haplogroups by ethnic group
- Y-DNA haplogroups in populations of Sub-Saharan Africa

=== Y-DNA E subclades ===
- Haplogroup E-L485
- Haplogroup E-M123
- Haplogroup E-M180
- Haplogroup E-M215
- Haplogroup E-M33
- Haplogroup E-M521
- Haplogroup E-M75
- Haplogroup E-M96
- Haplogroup E-P147
- Haplogroup E-P177
- Haplogroup E-P2
- Haplogroup E-V12
- Haplogroup E-V13
- Haplogroup E-V22
- Haplogroup E-V38
- Haplogroup E-M2
- Haplogroup E-V65
- Haplogroup E-V68
- Haplogroup E-Z820
- Haplogroup E-Z827
