= Haplogroup E-M75 =

Human Y-chromosome DNA haplogroup

- Possible time of origin: 52,300 years BP
- Coalescence age: 37,400 years BP
- Possible place of origin: Africa
- Ancestor: E-M96
- Descendants: E-M41, E-M54
- Defining mutations: M75, P68

Haplogroup E-M75 is a human Y-chromosome DNA haplogroup. Along with haplogroup E-P147, it is one of the two main branches of the older haplogroup E-M96.

== Ancient DNA ==
=== Within Africa ===
==== Kenya ====
At Prettejohn's Gully, in Nakuru County, Kenya, there were two pastoralists of the early pastoral period; one carried haplogroups E2 (xE2b)/E-M75 and K1a, and another carried haplogroup L3f1b.

At Ilkek Mounds, in Nakuru County, Kenya, a pastoralist of the Pastoral Iron Age carried haplogroups E2 (xE2b)/E-M75 and L0f2a.

At Kisima Farm/C4, in Laikipia County, Kenya, a pastoralist of the Pastoral Iron Age, carried haplogroups E2 (xE2b)/E-M75 and L3h1a1.

=== Outside of Africa ===
==== United States of America ====
At an Anson Street burial site, in Charleston, South Carolina, there were 18 African Americans found who were dated to the 18th century CE. Coosaw, who was of West African and Native American ancestry, carried haplogroups E2b1a-CTS2400 and A2.

== Distribution ==
Sorted frequency table of E-M75+ populations. Note that a "?" specifies that the sublineage of E-M75 was either untested for or unreported in the relevant study.

Population	Region	Size	E-M75+	M41+	M54+	E-M75+M41-M54-
Alur	East Africa	9	66.67%	66.67%	0.00%	0.00%
Hema	East Africa	18	38.89%	38.89%	0.00%	0.00%
Xhosa	South Africa	80	27.50%	0.00%	27.50%	0.00%
Rimaibe	Western Africa	37	27.03%	?	27.03%	?
Mbuti Pygmies	Central Africa	12	25.00%	?	25.00%	?
Daba	Central Western Africa	18	22.22%	?	22.22%	?
Eviya	Central Western Africa	24	20.83%	?	?	?
Zulu	South Africa	29	20.69%	0.00%	20.69%	0.00%
Bantu (Kenya)	East Africa	29	17.24%	3.45%	13.79%	0.00%
Ethiopia	East Africa	88	17.05%	17.05%	0.00%	0.00%
Ganda	East Africa	26	15.38%	7.69%	3.85%	3.85%
S.Africa	South Africa	53	15.09%	0.00%	15.09%	0.00%
Comorian Shirazi	East Africa	-	14.00%	0.00%	14.00%	0.00%
Akele	Central Western Africa	50	12.00%	?	?	?
Eshira	Central Western Africa	42	11.90%	?	?	?
Dama	South Africa	18	11.11%	0.00%	5.56%	5.56%
Mixed Nilo-Saharan	Central Western Africa	9	11.11%	?	11.11%	?
Obamba	Central Western Africa	47	10.64%	?	?	?
Orungu	Central Western Africa	21	9.52%	?	?	?
Shake	Central Western Africa	43	9.30%	?	?	?
Senegalese	West Africa	33	9.09%	?	?	?
Hutu	East Africa	69	8.70%	4.35%	4.35%	0.00%
Duma	Central Western Africa	46	8.70%	?	?	?
Malagasy	Madagascar	35	8.57%	0.00%	8.57%	0.00%
Teke	Central Western Africa	48	8.33%	?	?	?
C.Africa	Central Africa	37	8.11%	0.00%	8.11%	0.00%
Mandara	Central Africa	28	7.14%	0.00%	7.14%	0.00%
Ngoumba	Central Africa	31	6.45%	0.00%	6.45%	0.00%
!Kung	South Africa	64	6.25%	?	6.25%	?
Ndumu	Central Western Africa	36	5.56%	?	?	?
African Americans	North America	199	5.53%	?	?	?
Fon	West Africa	100	5.00%	0.00%	5.00%	0.00%
Sudan	East Africa	40	5.00%	5.00%	0.00%	0.00%
Tsogo	Central Western Africa	60	5.00%	?	?	?
Ambo	South Africa	22	4.55%	0.00%	4.55%	0.00%
Mbuti Pygmies	East Africa	47	4.26%	0.00%	4.26%	0.00%
Tutsi	East Africa	94	4.26%	0.00%	4.26%	0.00%
Galoa	Central Western Africa	47	4.26%	?	?	?
Ngumba	Central Western Africa	24	4.17%	?	?	?
Mossi	Western Africa	49	4.08%	?	4.08%	?
Khwe	South Africa	26	3.85%	?	3.85%	?
Sotho-Tswana	South Africa	28	3.57%	0.00%	3.57%	0.00%
Nzebi	Central Western Africa	57	3.51%	?	?	?
Punu	Central Western Africa	58	3.45%	?	?	?
Bakola Pygmies	Central Africa	33	3.03%	0.00%	3.03%	0.00%
Wolof	West Africa	34	2.94%	0.00%	2.94%	0.00%
Senegalese	West Africa	139	2.88%	?	?	?
Mandinka	West Africa	39	2.56%	0.00%	0.00%	2.56%
Kikuyu & Kamba	East Africa	42	2.38%	0.00%	2.38%	0.00%
Wairak	East Africa	43	2.33%	2.33%	0.00%	0.00%
Makina	Central Western Africa	43	2.33%	?	?	?
Benga	Central Western Africa	48	2.08%	?	?	?
Shona	South Africa	49	2.04%	0.00%	0.00%	2.04%
Kota	Central Western Africa	53	1.89%	?	?	?
Dogon	West Africa	55	1.82%	0.00%	1.82%	0.00%
Arabs (Oman)	Near East/Asia	121	1.65%	0.00%	1.65%	0.00%
Ethiopian (Oromo)	East Africa	78	1.28%	?	?	?

== Subclades ==
=== E-M75* ===
Haplogroup E-M75(xM41,M54) has been found in 6% (1/18) of a sample of Dama from Namibia, 4% (1/26) of a sample of Ganda from Uganda, 3% (1/39) of a sample of Mandinka from Gambia/Senegal, and 2% (1/49) of a sample of Shona from Zimbabwe.

=== E-M41 ===
Haplogroup E-M41 has been found mainly in populations of the Great Lakes and Upper Nile regions of Central-East Africa, including 67% (6/9) of a sample of Alur from the DRC, 39% (7/18) of a sample of Hema from the DRC, 17% (15/88) of a sample from Ethiopia, 8% (2/26) of a sample of Ganda from Uganda, 5% (2/40) of a sample from Sudan, 4% (3/69) of a sample of Hutu from Rwanda, 3% (1/29) of a sample of Bantus from Kenya, and 2% (1/43) of a sample of Iraqw from Tanzania. E-M41 has also been identified in noticeable amounts among commercial DNA testers from the Arabian Peninsula and among a few Ashkenazi Jewish males, and also in a male from Lebanon.

=== E-M54 ===
Haplogroup E-M54 has been found in 28% (22/80) of a sample of Xhosa from South Africa, 27% (10/37) of a sample of Rimaibe from Burkina Faso, 22% (4/18) of a sample of Daba from northern Cameroon, 21% (6/29) of a sample of Zulu from South Africa, 15% (8/53) of a sample of non-Khoisan Southern Africans, 14% (4/29) of a sample of Bantus from Kenya, 14% of a sample of Comorian Shirazi, 11% (1/9) of a small sample of speakers of Central Sudanic and Saharan languages from northern Cameroon, 9% (3/35) of a sample of Malagasy from Madagascar, 8% (3/37) of a sample from Central Africa, 7% (2/28) of a sample of Mandara from northern Cameroon, 6% (2/31) of a sample of Ngumba from southern Cameroon, 6% (4/64) of a sample of !Kung from South Africa, 6% (1/18) of a sample of Dama from Namibia, 5% (5/100) of a sample of Fon from Benin, 5% (1/22) of a sample of Ambo from Namibia, 4% (3/69) of a sample of Hutu from Rwanda, 4% (4/94) of a sample of Tutsi from Rwanda, 4% (2/47) of a sample of Mbuti from the DRC, 4% (1/26) of a sample of Ganda from Uganda, 4% (1/26) of a sample of Khwe from South Africa, 4% (1/28) of a sample of Sotho-Tswana from South Africa, 3% (1/33) of a sample of Bakola from southern Cameroon, 3% (1/34) of a sample of Wolof from Gambia/Senegal, 3% (2/72) of a sample from Qatar, 2% (1/42) of a sample of Kikuyu and Kamba from Kenya, 2% (1/55) of a sample of Dogon from Mali, and approximately 2% of a sample of 121 Arabs from Oman.

It has been suggested that haplogroup E-M85 Y-chromosomes have spread through Sub-Saharan Africa quite recently based on the fact that Y-STR microsatellite haplotypes associated with these chromosomes show a low degree of differentiation throughout their broad geographic range. Furthermore, the mean variance of STR alleles of E-M85 chromosomes is higher in Central-Western Africans than in the Southern African Khoisan, leading researchers to propose that E-M85 might have been involved in the range expansion of Bantu-speaking peoples from Central-Western Africa toward Southern Africa.

==== E-M98* ====
E-M98(xM85) has been found in 4% (2/49) of a sample of Mossi from Burkina Faso.

===== E-M200 =====
E-M200 has been found in 25% (3/12) of a small sample of Mbuti from the Democratic Republic of the Congo. According to Figure 4 of Cruciani (2002), all three Bambuti who exhibit the M200 mutation share an identical microsatellite haplotype based on seven STR loci with one another and with some E-M85(xM200) Khoisan (!Kung and/or Khwe) individuals from South Africa.

== Phylogenetics ==
=== Phylogenetic history ===
Prior to 2002, there were in academic literature at least seven naming systems for the Y-Chromosome phylogenetic tree. This led to considerable confusion. In 2002, the major research groups came together and formed the Y-Chromosome Consortium (YCC). They published a joint paper that created a single new tree that all agreed to use. Later, a group of citizen scientists with an interest in population genetics and genetic genealogy formed a working group to create an amateur tree aiming at being, above all, timely. The table below brings together all of these works at the point of the landmark 2002 YCC tree. This allows a researcher reviewing older published literature to quickly move between nomenclatures.

YCC 2002/2008 (Shorthand)	(α)	(β)	(γ)	(δ)	(ε)	(ζ)	(η)	YCC 2002 (Longhand)	YCC 2005 (Longhand)	YCC 2008 (Longhand)	YCC 2010r (Longhand)	ISOGG 2006	ISOGG 2007	ISOGG 2008	ISOGG 2009	ISOGG 2010	ISOGG 2011	ISOGG 2012
E-P29	21	III	3A	13	Eu3	H2	B	E*	E	E	E	E	E	E	E	E	E	E
E-M33	21	III	3A	13	Eu3	H2	B	E1*	E1	E1a	E1a	E1	E1	E1a	E1a	E1a	E1a	E1a
E-M44	21	III	3A	13	Eu3	H2	B	E1a	E1a	E1a1	E1a1	E1a	E1a	E1a1	E1a1	E1a1	E1a1	E1a1
E-M75	21	III	3A	13	Eu3	H2	B	E2a	E2	E2	E2	E2	E2	E2	E2	E2	E2	E2
E-M54	21	III	3A	13	Eu3	H2	B	E2b	E2b	E2b	E2b1	-	-	-	-	-	-	-
E-P2	25	III	4	14	Eu3	H2	B	E3*	E3	E1b	E1b1	E3	E3	E1b1	E1b1	E1b1	E1b1	E1b1
E-M2	8	III	5	15	Eu2	H2	B	E3a*	E3a	E1b1	E1b1a	E3a	E3a	E1b1a	E1b1a	E1b1a	E1b1a1	E1b1a1
E-M58	8	III	5	15	Eu2	H2	B	E3a1	E3a1	E1b1a1	E1b1a1	E3a1	E3a1	E1b1a1	E1b1a1	E1b1a1	E1b1a1a1a	E1b1a1a1a
E-M116.2	8	III	5	15	Eu2	H2	B	E3a2	E3a2	E1b1a2	E1b1a2	E3a2	E3a2	E1b1a2	E1b1a2	E1ba12	removed	removed
E-M149	8	III	5	15	Eu2	H2	B	E3a3	E3a3	E1b1a3	E1b1a3	E3a3	E3a3	E1b1a3	E1b1a3	E1b1a3	E1b1a1a1c	E1b1a1a1c
E-M154	8	III	5	15	Eu2	H2	B	E3a4	E3a4	E1b1a4	E1b1a4	E3a4	E3a4	E1b1a4	E1b1a4	E1b1a4	E1b1a1a1g1c	E1b1a1a1g1c
E-M155	8	III	5	15	Eu2	H2	B	E3a5	E3a5	E1b1a5	E1b1a5	E3a5	E3a5	E1b1a5	E1b1a5	E1b1a5	E1b1a1a1d	E1b1a1a1d
E-M10	8	III	5	15	Eu2	H2	B	E3a6	E3a6	E1b1a6	E1b1a6	E3a6	E3a6	E1b1a6	E1b1a6	E1b1a6	E1b1a1a1e	E1b1a1a1e
E-M35	25	III	4	14	Eu4	H2	B	E3b*	E3b	E1b1b1	E1b1b1	E3b1	E3b1	E1b1b1	E1b1b1	E1b1b1	removed	removed
E-M78	25	III	4	14	Eu4	H2	B	E3b1*	E3b1	E1b1b1a	E1b1b1a1	E3b1a	E3b1a	E1b1b1a	E1b1b1a	E1b1b1a	E1b1b1a1	E1b1b1a1
E-M148	25	III	4	14	Eu4	H2	B	E3b1a	E3b1a	E1b1b1a3a	E1b1b1a1c1	E3b1a3a	E3b1a3a	E1b1b1a3a	E1b1b1a3a	E1b1b1a3a	E1b1b1a1c1	E1b1b1a1c1
E-M81	25	III	4	14	Eu4	H2	B	E3b2*	E3b2	E1b1b1b	E1b1b1b1	E3b1b	E3b1b	E1b1b1b	E1b1b1b	E1b1b1b	E1b1b1b1	E1b1b1b1a
E-M107	25	III	4	14	Eu4	H2	B	E3b2a	E3b2a	E1b1b1b1	E1b1b1b1a	E3b1b1	E3b1b1	E1b1b1b1	E1b1b1b1	E1b1b1b1	E1b1b1b1a	E1b1b1b1a1
E-M165	25	III	4	14	Eu4	H2	B	E3b2b	E3b2b	E1b1b1b2	E1b1b1b1b1	E3b1b2	E3b1b2	E1b1b1b2a	E1b1b1b2a	E1b1b1b2a	E1b1b1b2a	E1b1b1b1a2a
E-M123	25	III	4	14	Eu4	H2	B	E3b3*	E3b3	E1b1b1c	E1b1b1c	E3b1c	E3b1c	E1b1b1c	E1b1b1c	E1b1b1c	E1b1b1c	E1b1b1b2a
E-M34	25	III	4	14	Eu4	H2	B	E3b3a*	E3b3a	E1b1b1c1	E1b1b1c1	E3b1c1	E3b1c1	E1b1b1c1	E1b1b1c1	E1b1b1c1	E1b1b1c1	E1b1b1b2a1
E-M136	25	III	4	14	Eu4	H2	B	E3ba1	E3b3a1	E1b1b1c1a	E1b1b1c1a1	E3b1c1a	E3b1c1a	E1b1b1c1a1	E1b1b1c1a1	E1b1b1c1a1	E1b1b1c1a1	E1b1b1b2a1a1

==== Research publications ====
The following research teams per their publications were represented in the creation of the YCC tree.

- α Jobling and Tyler-Smith 2000 and Kaladjieva 2001
- β Underhill 2000
- γ Hammer 2001
- δ Karafet 2001
- ε Semino 2000
- ζ Su 1999
- η Capelli 2001

=== Phylogenetic trees ===
This phylogenetic tree of haplogroup subclades is based on the YCC 2008 tree and subsequent published research.

- E-M75 (M75, P68)
  - E-M41 (M41/P210)
  - E-M98 (M98)
    - E-M54 (M54, M90)
      - E-M85 (M85)
        - E-M200 (M200)
          - E-P45 (P45)
          - E-P258 (P258)

== See also ==
=== Genetics ===
- African admixture in Europe
- Genetic genealogy
- Haplogroup D
- Haplogroup DE
- Haplogroup
- Haplotype
- Human Y-chromosome DNA haplogroup
- Molecular phylogenetics
- Paragroup
- Subclade
- Y-chromosome haplogroups in populations of the world
- Y-DNA haplogroups by ethnic group
- Y-DNA haplogroups in populations of Sub-Saharan Africa

=== Y-DNA E subclades ===
- Haplogroup E-L485
- Haplogroup E-M123
- Haplogroup E-M180
- Haplogroup E-M215
- Haplogroup E-M33
- Haplogroup E-M521
- Haplogroup E-M75
- Haplogroup E-M96
- Haplogroup E-P147
- Haplogroup E-P177
- Haplogroup E-P2
- Haplogroup E-V12
- Haplogroup E-V13
- Haplogroup E-V22
- Haplogroup E-V38
- Haplogroup E-M2
- Haplogroup E-V65
- Haplogroup E-V68
- Haplogroup E-Z820
- Haplogroup E-Z827
