= Haplogroup E-M123 =

Human Y-chromosome haplogroup

- Possible time of origin: 15,000-20,000 ybp
- Possible place of origin: Middle East or Sub-Saharan Africa
- Ancestor: E-Z830
- Descendants: E-M34
- Defining mutations: M123, L798.1, L799, L857

In human genetics, Y Haplogroup E-M123 is a Y-chromosome haplogroup, and defined by the single nucleotide polymorphism (SNP) mutation M123. Like its closest relatives within the larger E-M215 haplogroup, E-M123 is found in Asia, Europe and Africa.

== Origin ==
The Levant and East Africa have both been proposed as the most likely origin for this lineage rather than North Africa. On the African continent, E-M34 seems to be localized to Semitic speakers in Ethiopia, and it has not been detected in other populations in the region such as in Somalia, Kenya, Morocco, Algeria, Egypt.

== Distribution ==
E-M123 is best known for its major sub-clade E-M34, which dominates this clade. (Note: As of 11 November 2008 for example, the E-M35 phylogeny project had records of four E-M123* tests (20 records; 26 May 2017), compared to 93 test results with E-M34.) However, earlier studies did not test for E-M34. Looking beyond its geographical patterns, E-M123 is also quite common in many Semitic language communities, including among Ashkenazi, and Sephardic Jews, accounting for over 10% of all male lines (Semino et al. 2004).

Region and Population	N	E-M34	Study
Jordanians (Dead sea)	45	31.1	Flores et al. 2005
Ethiopian Amhara	34	23.5	Cruciani et al. 2004
Maronite Cypriot	57	21.05	Comparative Y-chromosome analysis among Cypriots in the context of historical events and migrations. 2021
Libyan Jews	20	20.0	Shen et al. 2004
Greek Cypriot	344	13.10	Y-chromosomal analysis of Greek Cypriots reveals a primarily common pre-Ottoman paternal ancestry with Turkish Cypriots. 2017
Ethiopian Jews	22	13.6	Cruciani et al. 2004
Kurd	59	13.6	Grugni et al. 2012
Albanians in Calabria	68	13.2	Semino et al. 2004
Jordanians	146	13.01	Floris et al. 2005
Beja Portugal	8	12.5	Beleza et al. 2006
Oman	121	12.0	Abu-amero et al. 2009
Sahara/Mauritania	189	11.1	Bekada et al. 2013
Assyrian Tehran Iran	9	11.1	Grugni et al. 2012
Mazara del Vallo Sicily Italy	18	11.1	Di Gaetano et al. 2009
Piazza Armerina Sicily Italy	28	10.71	Di Gaetano et al. 2009
Troina Sicily Italy	30	10.0	Di Gaetano et al. 2009
Algerian Kabyles	19	10.5	Arredi et al. 2004
Northern Egyptians	49	10.2	Trombetta et al. 2015
Hazara (Bamiyan)	69	10.1	Di Cristofaro et al. 2013
Yemeni Jews	20	10.0	Shen et al. 2004
Sephardim Jewish	40	10.0	Semino et al. 2004
Ashkenazi Jews non-Levite, non-Cohanim	74	10.0	Hammer et al. 2009
Palestinians	367	9.5	Zalloua et al. 2008
Azeri Iran	63	9.5	Grugni et al. 2012
Ethiopian Wolayta	12	8.3	Cruciani et al. 2004
Yemen	62	8.1	Cadenas et al. 2007
Ethiopian Oromo	25	8	Cruciani et al. 2004
Erzurum Turkish	25	8	Cruciani et al. 2004
Omanite	13	7.7	Cruciani et al. 2004
Bedouins	28	7.1	Cruciani et al. 2004
Sicilians	136	6.6	Cruciani et al. 2004
Sephardi Turkish	19	5.3	Cruciani et al. 2004
United Arab Emirates	41	4.9	Cruciani et al. 2004
Northern Egyptians	21	4.8	Cruciani et al. 2004
Southeastern Turkish	24	4.2	Cruciani et al. 2004
Armenians	413	4.1	Herrera et al. 2011
Druze Arabs	28	3.6	Cruciani et al. 2004
Sardinians	367	3.5	Cruciani et al. 2004
Marrakesh Berbers	29	3.4	Cruciani et al. 2004
Palestinians	29	3.4	Cruciani et al. 2004
Central Anatolian	61	3.3	Cruciani et al. 2004
Istanbul Turkish	35	2.9	Cruciani et al. 2004
Southwestern Turkish	40	2.5	Cruciani et al. 2004
Southern Italians	87	2.3	Cruciani et al. 2004
Turkish Cypriots	46	2.2	Cruciani et al. 2004
Azeri	97	2.1	Cruciani et al. 2004
Northern Italians	67	1.5	Cruciani et al. 2004
Corsicans	140	1.4	Cruciani et al. 2004
Asturians	90	1.1	Cruciani et al. 2004
Caucasus	1952	0.4	Yunusbayev et al. 2011
Northern Portuguese	50	...	Cruciani et al. 2004
Southern Portuguese	49	...	Cruciani et al. 2004
Pasiegos from Cantabria	56	...	Cruciani et al. 2004
Southern Spaniards	62	...	Cruciani et al. 2004
Spanish Basques	55	...	Cruciani et al. 2004
French	85	...	Cruciani et al. 2004
French Basques	16	...	Cruciani et al. 2004
Orkney Islanders	7	...	Cruciani et al. 2004
Danish	35	...	Cruciani et al. 2004
Central Italians	89	...	Cruciani et al. 2004
Polish	38	...	Cruciani et al. 2004
Estonians	74	...	Cruciani et al. 2004
Russians	42	...	Cruciani et al. 2004
Romanians	14	...	Cruciani et al. 2004
Bulgarians	808	1.9	Karachanak et al. 2013
Albanians	19	...	Cruciani et al. 2004

=== Subclade distribution ===
==== E-M123* (tested and definitely without E-M34) ====
Such cases are relatively rare, but the following have been reported.

- Cruciani et al. (2004) located one individual in Bulgaria after testing 3401 individuals from five continents (of which 116 were Bulgarian), and Underhill et al. (2000) located one individual in Central Asia out of 1062 people tested, including 184 from Central Asia and Siberia.
- In a 568-person study in Iberia, Flores et al. (2005) found two E-M123* individuals, both in Northern Portugal out of 109 people tested there.
- In a 553-person study of Portugal, Gonçalves et al. (2005) also found two E-M123* individuals in Northern Portugal, out of 101 people, as well as 2 in Madeira out of 129 people tested there.
- Flores et al. (2005) found one individual out of 146 Jordanians, this being one of the 101 individuals tested in Amman.
- Arredi et al. (2004) found 1 Tunisian from Tunis in their study of 275 men in Northern Africa, which included 148 people from Tunis.
- Studies which tested for E-M123* but found none include...

- Cinnioğlu et al. (2004), with 523 individuals in Anatolia;
- Cadenas et al. (2007) found none amongst the significant presence of E-M34 they found in their study of the UAE, Yemen and Qatar.
- Martinez et al. (2007) found none in their 168 person study of Crete.
- Shen et al. (2004) found none in their study of 169 Israelis and Palestinians of various ancestry.

E-M123 has sometimes been reported without checking for the M-34 SNP, for example:

- Bosch et al. (2006) found E-M123 examples in Greece, the Republic of Macedonia, and Romania.
- Beleza et al. (2006) also found examples in Portugal.
- Sanchez et al. (2005) found one sample in Somalia.
- Semino et al. (2004) reports relatively high levels of 13% in the Albanian community of Cosenza, in Calabria. A notably high regional frequency for E-M123 was in Oman, where it is apparently the dominant clade of E-M35.
- Luis et al. (2004) found 12 men out of 121 there were E-M123 positive, while in Egypt there were 7 out of 147. But in that study the Omani E-M123 diversity implied a younger age than the E-M123 found in Egypt. (Cruciani et al. (2004) tested for E-M34 in Oman and found 7.7% to be E-M34+, with no E-M123*.)
- Di Gaetano et al. (2009) found 4.66% overall in their 236-person study of Sicily, with higher levels in the east of the island. They found none in Trapani (33 people), Alcamo (24 people), and Cacamo (16 people) along the west of the north coast; 3.23% in San Ninfa (31 people) inland in the west; 3.57% in Sciacca (28 people) and Ragusa (28 people) along the south coast; and then high levels in the east in Troina (10% of 30 people), Piazza Armerina (10.71% of 28 people), as well as near the Southwestern extreme facing Africa at Mazaro de Vallo (11.11% of 18 people).
- Adams et al. (2008) found 11 E-M123 people in their 1140-person study of Iberia: 1 out of 95 Eastern Andalusians; 1 out of 100 NW Castilians; 1 out of 80 Catalans; 2 out of 52 Extramadurans; 2 out of 60 Northern Portuguese, 1 out of 78 Southern Portuguese, 1 out of 73 Southern Portuguese; 1 out of 73 Valencians; and highest levels apparently in the Balearics with 5 out of 37 Minorcans and 4 out of 54 Ibizans. There were none in Majorca (62 people), Gascony (24), Galicia (88), NE Castile (31), Castilla la Mancha (63), The Basque Country (116), the Asturias (20), West Andalucia (73), and Aragon (34).
- Contu et al. (2008) found 9 out of 323 people in 3 areas of Sardinia. 4 out of 187 in Cagliari, 1 out of 103 in Sorgono, and 4 out of 86 in Tempio.
- Shen et al. (2004) found 10 out of 169 Israelis and Palestinians of various ancestry to be M123+ and M34+, with the highest level group being 4 out of 20 Israeli Jews of Libyan ancestry

And E-M34 has sometimes been tested without testing for M123:

- According to Cruciani et al. (2004), E-M34 is found at small frequencies in North Africa and Southern Europe (6.6% in Sicily for example), and has its highest concentration in Ethiopia and the Near East (with highest levels in Oman and Turkey). However, because the diversity is apparently low in Ethiopia, the authors suggest that E-M34 was likely introduced into Ethiopia from the Near East.
- In Turkey, Cinnioğlu et al. (2004) found slightly more E-M34 (29) than E-M78 (26) out of 523 individuals tested (a far different E1b1b population than found in the nearby Balkans).
- Flores et al. (2004) reported E-M34 in several parts of Iberia, but most strikingly about 10% in Galicia.
- Gonçalves et al. (2005) found about the same levels of E-M34 in Portugal as E-M123*, but E-M34 mainly in Central Portugal (4 people out of 102 tested there) with one more person found in the Açores.
- Strikingly, Flores et al. (2005) found 14 out of 45 men tested in the Dead Sea area of Jordan to be M34 positive (31.1%), while in the capital Amman there were only 4 out of 101.
- Cadenas et al. (2007) found 8.1% of 62 men tested in Yemen were positive for M34, compared to much lower levels in Qatar (1.4%) and the UAE (3.1%).
- Arredi et al. (2004) in their study of 275 men in Northern Africa found 2 out of 148 Tunisians from Tunis, 2 out of 19 Algerian Berbers from Tizi Ouzu in Kabylie (10.5%), and 3 out of 44 North Egyptians, 4 out of 29 South Egyptians (So 9.5% in all Egyptians).
- Martinez et al. (2007) found 3 in their 168-person study of Crete, 2 in Heraklion and 1 in Lasithi.
- Regueiro et al. (2006) found one in South Iran out of 117 people, and none in North Iran out of 33 people.
- Zalloua et al. (2008) found 26 E-M123 cases in Cyprus, out of 164 men tested; and 27 Palestinians out of 291 tested. This was apparently higher than the level of E-M78.

==== Subclades of E-M34 ====
- E-M84, defined by SNP mutation M84, with M136 defining a sub-clade as of October 2008. The E-M35 Phylogeny Project estimates based on testing so far (in January 2009) that E-M84 is dominant in 6 out of the 8 clusters of E-M34 which that project identifies.
- E-M290, defined by SNP mutation M290. Shen et al. (2004) found 1 Palestinian exemplar.
- E-V23, defined by SNP mutation V23. Trombetta et al. (2011) announced the discovery of this clade. They found it in two African individuals. The authors warned that they had not yet confirmed that this clade was not a sub-clade or parent clade of either M84 or M290, so the phylogenetic position E1b1b1c1c is tentative.

== Ancient DNA ==
- According to the genetic analyses done on six Natufian remains from Northern Israel, the Natufians carried the Y-DNA haplogroup E-Z830, a somewhat upwind clade of E-M123 (and therefore ancestral to it). The Natufians were one of the first settled peoples in the world and may have contributed to the domestication of certain crops, and thus the advent of agriculture. The discovery of E-Z830 (without other clades) suggests an indigenous presence in Canaan and Israel that predates all other clades, which are not known to have existed in the region at the time (10,000 years before present). E-M123 is thought to have a TMRCA about 18,000 years ago, 8,000 years before the Natufian (possibly ancestral) remains are from.
- Haplogroup E1b1b1b2 has been found in 75% of the 'Ain Ghazal population, along with 60% of PPNB populations circa 8,800–6,500 BC. (See: 'Ain Ghazal).
- A study on population genomics of Anatolia, the Caucasus and the Levant found in Arslantepe one individual who lived circa 3369-3110 BC, who belonged to E-M84 (E1b1b1b2a1a1~).
- A study on the population genomics of Bronze Age Eurasia found in the remains from Nerkin Getashen in Armenia, lived during the Middle Bronze Age, two E-M84.
- A study on population genomics of Anatolia, the Caucasus and the Levant found in the ancient city of Ebla during the Bronze Age, one male individual who is E-M84 (E1b1b1b2a1a1~).
- A study on South Asian history, Narasimhan et al. (2019), found several individuals who belonged to E-Y31991 in Late Bronze Age/Early Iron Age samples in the Swat valley, modern north Pakistan.
- A 137-sample study of ancient Eurasian genomes found one Central Scythian who belonged to E-M123* (E-Y31991), in modern northeast Kazakhstan, dated from 800-750BC. According to the BAM file, made available by the authors, he's presumed to be E-Y168273, a clade downstream of PF4428 which is itself under E-M123*.

== Phylogenetics ==
=== Phylogenetic history ===
Prior to 2002, there were in academic literature at least seven naming systems for the Y-Chromosome Phylogenetic tree. This led to considerable confusion. In 2002, the major research groups came together and formed the Y-Chromosome Consortium (YCC). They published a joint paper that created a single new tree that all agreed to use. Later, a group of citizen scientists with an interest in population genetics and genetic genealogy formed a working group to create an amateur tree aiming at being above all timely. The table below brings together all of these works at the point of the landmark 2002 YCC Tree. This allows a researcher reviewing older published literature to quickly move between nomenclatures.

YCC 2002/2008 (Shorthand)	(α)	(β)	(γ)	(δ)	(ε)	(ζ)	(η)	YCC 2002 (Longhand)	YCC 2005 (Longhand)	YCC 2008 (Longhand)	YCC 2010r (Longhand)	ISOGG 2006	ISOGG 2007	ISOGG 2008	ISOGG 2009	ISOGG 2010	ISOGG 2011	ISOGG 2012
E-P29	21	III	3A	13	Eu3	H2	B	E*	E	E	E	E	E	E	E	E	E	E
E-M33	21	III	3A	13	Eu3	H2	B	E1*	E1	E1a	E1a	E1	E1	E1a	E1a	E1a	E1a	E1a
E-M44	21	III	3A	13	Eu3	H2	B	E1a	E1a	E1a1	E1a1	E1a	E1a	E1a1	E1a1	E1a1	E1a1	E1a1
E-M75	21	III	3A	13	Eu3	H2	B	E2a	E2	E2	E2	E2	E2	E2	E2	E2	E2	E2
E-M54	21	III	3A	13	Eu3	H2	B	E2b	E2b	E2b	E2b1	-	-	-	-	-	-	-
E-P2	25	III	4	14	Eu3	H2	B	E3*	E3	E1b	E1b1	E3	E3	E1b1	E1b1	E1b1	E1b1	E1b1
E-M2	8	III	5	15	Eu2	H2	B	E3a*	E3a	E1b1	E1b1a	E3a	E3a	E1b1a	E1b1a	E1b1a	E1b1a1	E1b1a1
E-M58	8	III	5	15	Eu2	H2	B	E3a1	E3a1	E1b1a1	E1b1a1	E3a1	E3a1	E1b1a1	E1b1a1	E1b1a1	E1b1a1a1a	E1b1a1a1a
E-M116.2	8	III	5	15	Eu2	H2	B	E3a2	E3a2	E1b1a2	E1b1a2	E3a2	E3a2	E1b1a2	E1b1a2	E1ba12	removed	removed
E-M149	8	III	5	15	Eu2	H2	B	E3a3	E3a3	E1b1a3	E1b1a3	E3a3	E3a3	E1b1a3	E1b1a3	E1b1a3	E1b1a1a1c	E1b1a1a1c
E-M154	8	III	5	15	Eu2	H2	B	E3a4	E3a4	E1b1a4	E1b1a4	E3a4	E3a4	E1b1a4	E1b1a4	E1b1a4	E1b1a1a1g1c	E1b1a1a1g1c
E-M155	8	III	5	15	Eu2	H2	B	E3a5	E3a5	E1b1a5	E1b1a5	E3a5	E3a5	E1b1a5	E1b1a5	E1b1a5	E1b1a1a1d	E1b1a1a1d
E-M10	8	III	5	15	Eu2	H2	B	E3a6	E3a6	E1b1a6	E1b1a6	E3a6	E3a6	E1b1a6	E1b1a6	E1b1a6	E1b1a1a1e	E1b1a1a1e
E-M35	25	III	4	14	Eu4	H2	B	E3b*	E3b	E1b1b1	E1b1b1	E3b1	E3b1	E1b1b1	E1b1b1	E1b1b1	removed	removed
E-M78	25	III	4	14	Eu4	H2	B	E3b1*	E3b1	E1b1b1a	E1b1b1a1	E3b1a	E3b1a	E1b1b1a	E1b1b1a	E1b1b1a	E1b1b1a1	E1b1b1a1
E-M148	25	III	4	14	Eu4	H2	B	E3b1a	E3b1a	E1b1b1a3a	E1b1b1a1c1	E3b1a3a	E3b1a3a	E1b1b1a3a	E1b1b1a3a	E1b1b1a3a	E1b1b1a1c1	E1b1b1a1c1
E-M81	25	III	4	14	Eu4	H2	B	E3b2*	E3b2	E1b1b1b	E1b1b1b1	E3b1b	E3b1b	E1b1b1b	E1b1b1b	E1b1b1b	E1b1b1b1	E1b1b1b1a
E-M107	25	III	4	14	Eu4	H2	B	E3b2a	E3b2a	E1b1b1b1	E1b1b1b1a	E3b1b1	E3b1b1	E1b1b1b1	E1b1b1b1	E1b1b1b1	E1b1b1b1a	E1b1b1b1a1
E-M165	25	III	4	14	Eu4	H2	B	E3b2b	E3b2b	E1b1b1b2	E1b1b1b1b1	E3b1b2	E3b1b2	E1b1b1b2a	E1b1b1b2a	E1b1b1b2a	E1b1b1b2a	E1b1b1b1a2a
E-M123	25	III	4	14	Eu4	H2	B	E3b3*	E3b3	E1b1b1c	E1b1b1c	E3b1c	E3b1c	E1b1b1c	E1b1b1c	E1b1b1c	E1b1b1c	E1b1b1b2a
E-M34	25	III	4	14	Eu4	H2	B	E3b3a*	E3b3a	E1b1b1c1	E1b1b1c1	E3b1c1	E3b1c1	E1b1b1c1	E1b1b1c1	E1b1b1c1	E1b1b1c1	E1b1b1b2a1
E-M136	25	III	4	14	Eu4	H2	B	E3ba1	E3b3a1	E1b1b1c1a	E1b1b1c1a1	E3b1c1a	E3b1c1a	E1b1b1c1a1	E1b1b1c1a1	E1b1b1c1a1	E1b1b1c1a1	E1b1b1b2a1a1

==== Research publications ====
The following research teams per their publications were represented in the creation of the YCC tree.

- α Jobling and Tyler-Smith 2000 and Kaladjieva 2001
- β Underhill 2000
- γ Hammer 2001
- δ Karafet 2001
- ε Semino 2000
- ζ Su 1999
- η Capelli 2001

=== Phylogenetic trees ===
- E-M123 (M123)
  - E-M34 (M34)
    - E-M84 (M84)
      - E-M136 (M136)
    - E-M290 (M290)
    - E-V23 (V23)
    - E-L791 (L791, L792)

== See also ==
=== Genetics ===
- African admixture in Europe
- Genetic genealogy
- Haplogroup D (Y-DNA)
- Haplogroup DE (Y-DNA)
- Haplogroup
- Haplotype
- Human Y-chromosome DNA haplogroup
- Molecular phylogenetics
- Paragroup
- Subclade
- Y-chromosome haplogroups in populations of the world
- Y-DNA haplogroups by ethnic group
- Y-DNA haplogroups in populations of Sub-Saharan Africa

=== Y-DNA E subclades ===
- Haplogroup E-L485
- Haplogroup E-M123
- Haplogroup E-M180
- Haplogroup E-M215
- Haplogroup E-M33
- Haplogroup E-M521
- Haplogroup E-M75
- Haplogroup E-M96
- Haplogroup E-P147
- Haplogroup E-P177
- Haplogroup E-P2
- Haplogroup E-V12
- Haplogroup E-V13
- Haplogroup E-V22
- Haplogroup E-M2
- Haplogroup E-V65
- Haplogroup E-V68
- Haplogroup E-Z820
- Haplogroup E-Z827
