= African admixture in Europe =

Genetic mixing of peoples

African admixture in Europe refers to the presence of genetic admixture from African populations within present-day and historical European populations.

More recent African admixture, primarily by Punic, Berber and Arab admixture from North Africa, is associated with historic migrations through the Mediterranean Sea associated with the Carthaginian Empire, the Roman Empire, and the Muslim conquests of the Early Middle Ages. This admixture, though minor, is found primarily in the Iberian Peninsula (with higher levels in the West and the South), the Italian Peninsula (with higher levels in Southern Italy, Sardinia, and Sicily), Greece (with higher levels in the Aegean Islands), and Malta.

== Neolithic ==
The change from hunting and gathering to agriculture during the Neolithic Revolution was a watershed in world history. The societies that first made the change to agriculture are believed to have lived in Western Asia around 10,000 BCE. Agriculture was introduced into Europe c. 7000 BCE by migrating farmers from Anatolia, known as Anatolian Neolithic Farmers in the genetics literature. These farmers either replaced or interbred with local European hunter-gather populations that had been living in Europe since the Paleolithic. Early Neolithic farmers in Anatolia and Europe were similar genetically to modern-day southern European populations. European Neolithic farmers later introduced agriculture to Northwest Africa c. 5400 BC from southwestern Europe, contributing significantly to the genetic formation of the ancient (and modern) population of North Africa. A later expansion from Europe into North Africa by the Late Neolithic/Early Bronze Age Bell Beaker culture further contributed to the North African genepool.

It has been suggested that the first farmers in West Asia, descended from Natufian hunter-gatherers, reflected some North African influences or vice versa. There have been suggestions that some genetic lineages found in the Middle East arrived there during this period or earlier. The first agricultural societies in the Middle East are generally thought to have emerged from the Natufian culture between 12,000 and 10,000 BCE. The Natufians were widely semi-sedentary even before the introduction of agriculture.

== Historical period ==
In historical times, there has been a period of north African influence in southern Europe, especially in Iberia and parts of southern Italy (namely Sicily), during various Muslim conquests. The genetic effect of this period on modern European populations is the subject of discussion (see below). In more recent history, the peoples of Europe and Africa came into contact during the exploration and colonization of Africa and as a consequence of the Atlantic slave trade.

== Admixture analysis of modern populations ==
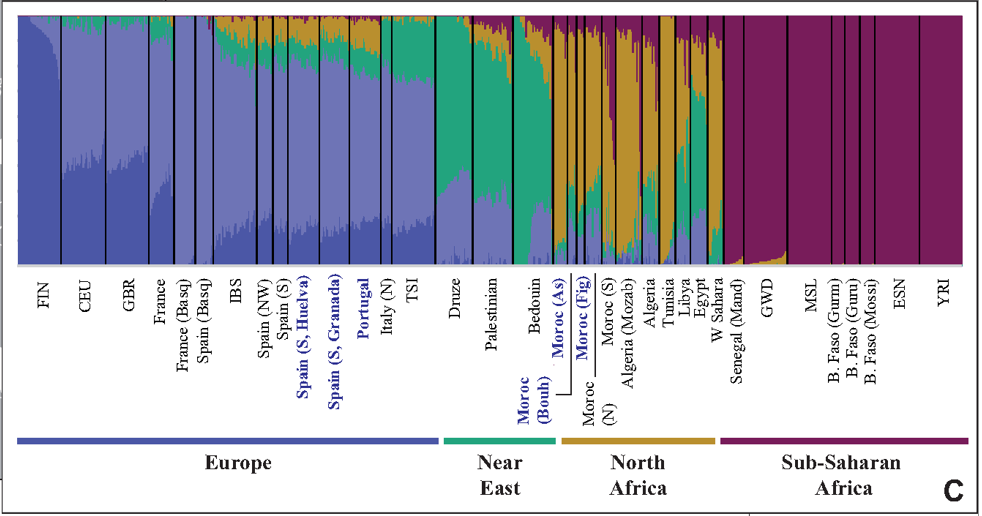
5 component admixture plots for European, West Asian, North African and West African populations (Hernández et al. 2019)

- Hernandez et al. (2020) identified 11.17 ± 1.87% North African ancestry in southern Portuguese samples (from a population similar to modern northern Moroccans and Algerians), 9.28 ± 1.79% of such ancestry in western Andalusians, and an average of 1.41 ± 0.72% sub-Saharan ancestry in southern Iberians (using Yoruba as a proxy source). Substantially lower levels of North African admixture were further detected in Northern Italians (0.77%) and Tuscans (1%).

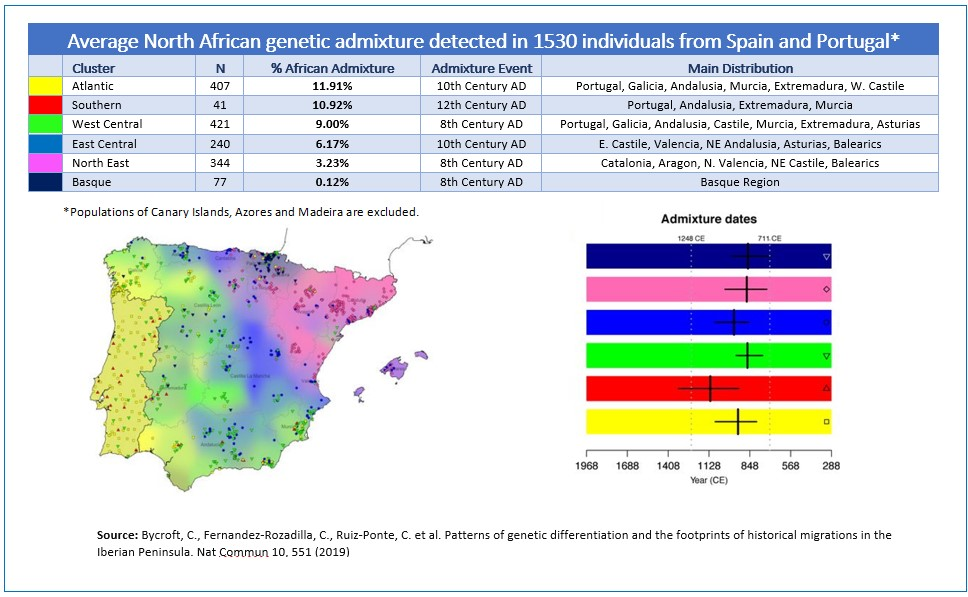
Distribution of North African Admixture in the Iberian Peninsula (Bycroft et al. 2019)

- Bycroft et al. (2019) identified regionally varying fractions of Northwest African ancestry in modern Iberians, ranging from 0–11%. This ancestry was found to be from a source population similar to modern Northwest Africans. The admixture was dated to 860–1120 CE, associated with the Muslim conquest and subsequent Reconquista. The highest levels of Northwest African admixture were identified in western Iberia whilst the lowest levels (0%) were found in the Basque region and an area in the North East roughly corresponding to the 14th-century Crown of Aragon. They also found some evidence for a second admixture event in Portuguese and Southern Spanish groups involving a second North African population within which a small sub-Saharan African component was detected. This admixture event was dated to approximately 1300 CE.

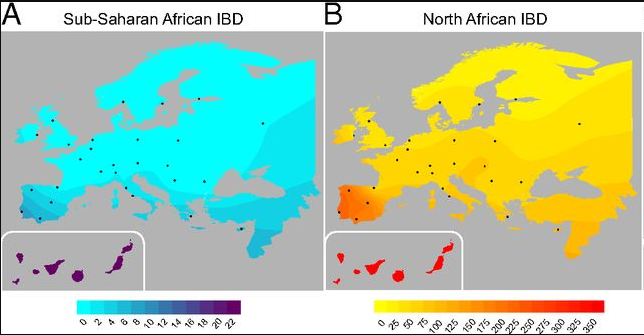
Haplotype-based estimates of genetic sharing between Europe and Africa (Botigué et al. 2013)

- Botigué et al. (2013) analysed genome-wide SNP data from over 2,000 modern individuals from Iberia. They estimated an average of 4% to 12% Northwest African admixture in modern Iberians (with low or zero levels in Basques), whereas populations in southeastern Europe had less than 2% of such admixture. Sub-Saharan African ancestry was detected at less than 1% in Europe, with the exception of the Canary Islands.
- Lazaridis et al. (2014) detected 12.6 ± 2% North African ancestry and an average of 1.5 ± 0.2% sub-Saharan ancestry in the Spanish population.
- Moorjani et al. (2011) estimated that some Southern Europeans have inherited 1%–3% sub-Saharan ancestry (approximately 3.2% in Portugal, 2.9% in Sardinia, 2.7% in southern Italy, 2.4% in Spain and 1.1% in northern Italy), although the percentages were lower (ranging from 0.2% in Sardinia and northern Italy to 2.1% in Portugal) when reanalyzed with the 'STRUCTURE' statistical model. An average mixture date of around 55 generations/1100 years ago was given, "consistent with North African gene flow at the end of the Roman Empire and subsequent Arab migrations". This admixture was not identified in Northern Europeans.
- Pino-Yanes et al. (2011) found that from an autosomal analysis, the average Northwest African influence is about 17% in Canary Islanders, with a wide interindividual variation ranging from 0% to 96%. The substantial Northwest African ancestry found for Canary Islanders supports the idea that, despite the aggressive conquest by the Spanish in the 15th century and the subsequent immigration, genetic footprints of the first settlers of the Canary Islands persist in the current inhabitants. Paralleling mtDNA findings, the largest average Northwest African contribution was found for the samples from La Gomera.

== Admixture analysis of historic populations ==
- In 2026, 111 individuals living during medieval Sicily from different sites ranging the periods of 5th to 15th centuries CE were studied. Mitochondrial DNA was gathered from 67 individuals, autosomal DNA from 32 alongside a previous set of 22 for whole genome analysis. The majority of samples plotted with Western and Southern European profiles during the early periods. During later periods, North African ancestry is persistent, while others on the PCA were shifted towards Middle Eastern groups, and West African ancestry was also present in individuals. The study found demographic continuity, even with these later population admixtures.
- A 2025 study found 20-30% of West African ancestry (with the remaining ancestry being continental northern European), in 2 of 18 early Medieval individuals buried at Kent and Dorset in England.
- Ricardo Rodríguez-Varela et al. (2024), studied 37 individuals from the 7th to 11th Century in Las Gobas, a necropolis in northern Spain. They found there was no significant increase of North African (Berber) or Middle East ancestries over time, before and after the Umayyad expansion. The authors proposed it may have been due to the communities isolation. However, North African admixture was detected in Visigothic individuals from southern Spain, hypothesized to be due to Punic movement into Iberia or pre-Islamic contact between southern Spain and North Africa.
- MacRoberts, Rebecca Anne et al. (2024) studied remains of the 8th-10th century AD in Portugal. Ancient DNA analysis conducted on three individuals revealed maternal (mtDNA) and paternal (Y-chromosome) lineages showing possible North African origin for some of the individuals. The mobility of females in this population was said to be higher than males, possibly because of the patriarchal structures practiced by Berber and Arab communities.
- Silva, M. et al. (2021), analyzed the genome for an individual who was buried in an Islamic necropolis at Segorbe, Spain. The sample's uniparentals pointed to North African origin, but on the autosomal level he displays both European and Northern African-related ancestries.
- Olalde et al. (2019) found evidence for 'sporadic contacts' between Iberia and North Africa in the Copper Age and Bronze Age. A male sample from central Iberia, dating from 2473–2030 cal BCE, was found to cluster with modern and ancient North Africans, characterised by ancestry from both Late Pleistocene North Africans and Early Neolithic Europeans. Another Bronze Age sample had 25% such North African ancestry. However, North African ancestry only became widespread in Iberia in the past ~2000 years, associated with the Roman Empire or earlier Punic presence and the later period of Muslim rule. The study analysed 45 samples from southeastern Spain dating from the 3rd-16th centuries CE, all of which fell outside the genetic variation of preceding Iberian Iron Age populations, harbouring ancestry from both southern European and North African populations, as well as additional Levantine-related ancestry. 2 samples out of 23 dating from the 10th to 16th centuries were also found to have partial sub-Saharan ancestry, which was not identified in earlier samples. Present-day southern Iberians harbour less African ancestry than Muslim period samples, likely due to subsequent population expulsions and repopulation from the north, as supported by historical sources and genetic analysis of present-day groups.
- Gleize, Yves et al. (2016), discovered that the paternal lineages of Muslim cemeteries in France had 3 individuals with North African ancestry. The analyses was said to confirm the Berber origin of some of the first Islamic troops spreading through Europe, and also indicated the co-existence of communities practicing Christian and Muslim funerary customs.

== Sex chromosomes ==
Generally, markers and lineages used to characterize African admixture are those that are believed to be specific to Africa. There are also DNA polymorphisms that are shared between populations native to Europe, West Asia, North Africa and the Horn of Africa, such as the Y-chromosomal haplogroup E1b1b and the mitochondrial haplogroup M1.

With regard to the paternal haplogroup E1b1b and maternal haplogroup M1, derivatives of these clades have been observed in prehistoric human fossils excavated at the Ifri n'Amr or Moussa site in Morocco, which have been radiocarbon-dated to the Early Neolithic period (ca. 5,000 BC). Ancient DNA analysis of these specimens indicates that they carried paternal haplotypes related to the E1b1b1b1a (E-M81) subclade and the maternal haplogroups U6a and M1, all of which are frequent among present-day communities in the Maghreb. These ancient individuals also bore an autochthonous Maghrebi genomic component that peaks among modern Berbers, indicating that they were ancestral to populations in the area. Additionally, fossils excavated at the Kelif el Boroud site near Rabat, were found to carry the broadly-distributed paternal haplogroup T-M184 as well as the maternal haplogroups K1, T2 and X2, the latter of which were common mtDNA lineages in Neolithic Europe and Anatolia. These ancient individuals likewise bore the Berber-associated Maghrebi genomic component, as well as Early European Farmer ancestry. This altogether indicates that the Late Neolithic Kelif el Boroud inhabitants were ancestral to contemporary populations in the area, but also experienced substantial gene flow from Europe.

Other lineages that are now found in Africa and Europe may have a common origin in Asia (e.g. Y haplogroups R1, and some paternal haplogroup T and U subclades). One subclade of haplogroup U, namely U6a1, is known to have expanded from northern and eastern Africa back into Europe even though haplogroup U6 is considered to have originated in the Middle East. Other lineages are known to have moved from Europe directly into Africa, for example mitochondrial haplogroups H1 and H3. Such bidirectional migrations between Africa and Eurasia complicate the task of defining admixture.

=== Y-DNA ===
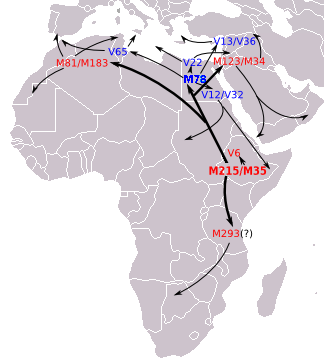
E3b1 and its haplogroups E-M81 and E-M78 in North Africa, and E-M123 in the Near East

One proposed example of Holocene gene flow from North Africa to Europe, via the Middle East, is thought to be E1b1b, which is considered to have emerged about 40,000 years ago in the Horn of Africa, and branches of it would have then migrated to the Middle East by 15,000 years ago during the late Pleistocene period.

Entering the late Mesolithic Natufian culture, the E1b1b1a2 (E-V13) subclade has been associated with the spread of farming from the Middle East into Europe either during or just before the Neolithic transition. E1b1b1 lineages are found throughout Europe but are distributed along a south-to-north cline, with an E1b1b1a mode in the Balkans. (Note: Recently, it has been proposed that E3b originated in eastern Africa and expanded into the Near East and northern Africa at the end of the Pleistocene. E3b lineages would have then been introduced from the Near East into southern Europe by migrant farmers, during the Neolithic expansion.) (Note: A Mesolithic population carrying Group III lineages with the M35/M215 mutation expanded northwards from sub-Saharan to north Africa and the Levant. The Levantine population of farmers that dispersed into Europe during and after the Neolithic carried these African Group III M35/M215 lineages, together with a cluster of Group VI lineages characterized by M172 and M201 mutations.)

In separate migrations, E lineages in the form of the E1b1b1b subclade appear to have entered Europe from Northwest Africa into Iberia. In a sample of European males, haplogroup E was observed at a frequency of 7.2%. The timing of this movement has been given widely varying estimates. In much of Europe, frequencies of E lineages are very low, usually less than 1%. For example, the frequency of such lineages are at 2% in southern Portugal, 4% in northern Portugal, 2.9% in Istanbul, and 4.3% among Turkish Cypriots. E1b1a is closely related to E1b1b, the most frequent clade in Northeast Africa, Northwest Africa and Europe. E lineages that are not E1b1a or E1b1b could therefore reflect either a recent expansion associated with E1b1a or ancient population movements associated with E1b1b. For example, haplogroup E1a lineages have been detected in Portugal (5/553 = 1%), among Italians in Calabria (1/80=1.3%), and among Albanians in Calabria (2/68=2.9%). The distribution of haplogroup E1a lineages in Portugal was independent of the distribution of the younger and more ubiquitous E1b1a. This distribution is consistent with a prehistoric migration from Africa to Iberia, possibly alongside mtDNA haplogroup U6. In Majorcans, Sub-Saharan Y-DNA lineage E-V38 was found at a total of 3.2% (2/62). Sub-Saharan Y-DNA lineages E3a, E1, BC*, (xE3), and E3* are found between 1 and 5% in Portugal, Valencia, Majorca, Cantabria, Málaga, Seville, and Galicia (Spain). In Sardinians, Sub-Saharan Y-DNA lineages A1b1b2b and E1a1 were found at a total of 1.0% (A1b1b2b 0.5% / E1a1 0.5%).

Haplogroups A and B are thought to have been the predominant haplogroups in central and southern Africa prior to the Bantu Expansion. Currently these haplogroups are less common than E lineages. In a sample of 5,000 African men, haplogroup A had a frequency of 5%. Haplogroup A has rare occurrences in Europe, but recently the haplogroup was detected in seven indigenous British males with the same Yorkshire surname.

The subclade E3b1 (probably originating in northeastern Africa) has a wide distribution in North Africa, the Horn of Africa, the Middle East, and Europe. This haplogroup, in Italy, is represented by E-M78, E-M123 and E-M81 (Figure 3) and reaches a frequency of 8% in northern and central Italy and slightly higher, 11%, in the south of that country.
It has also been argued that the European distribution of E3b1 is compatible with the Neolithic demic diffusion of agriculture; thus, two subclades—E3b1a-M78 and E3b1c-M123—present a higher occurrence in Anatolia, the Balkans, and the Italian Peninsula. Another subclade, E3b1b-M81 is associated with Berber populations and is commonly found in regions that have had historical gene flow with northern Africa, such as the Iberian Peninsula, the Canary Islands, and Sicily.

Haplotype V (p49/TaqI) is a characteristic North African Berber marker, with its highest frequency (68.9%) found in Moroccan Berbers. A study of 487 males indicates this marker exists in a north-south gradient in Iberia (40.8% in Andalusia, 36.2% in Portugal, 12.1% in Catalonia, and 11.3% in Basques), confirming substantial gene flow from North Africa to Iberia. A Y-chromosome study of 235 individuals in Zamora, Spain, revealed a homogeneous population, with 10.2% belonging to Northwest African lineages (E1b1b1b-M81, E1b1b1a-M78, and J1-M267), providing insights into the genetic impact of historical Islamic rule.

North African Y-DNA E-M81 was found at a total of 41.1% among "pasiegos" from Cantabria, Spain. That is the highest frequency observed in Europe to date. Estimates of this average Y-STR vary, but using 1140 samples from throughout the Iberian peninsula gave a proportion of 10.6%. From an analysis of the Y-chromosome with 659 samples from Southern Portugal, 680 from Northern Spain, 37 samples from Andalusia, 915 samples from mainland Italy, and 93 samples from Sicily also found significantly higher levels of North African male ancestry in Portugal, Spain and Sicily (7.1%, 7.7% and 7.5% respectively) than in peninsular Italy (1.7%). Considering both some E-M78 subhaplogroups and the E-M81 haplogroup, the contribution of northern African lineages to the entire male gene pool of Iberia (barring Pasiegos), continental Italy, and Sicily can be estimated as 5.6%, 3.6%, and 6.6%, respectively. Y-DNA lineages E-V12 and E-V22 have been associated with a Levantine source (represented by modern Lebanese), while North African haplogroup E-M81 shows an average frequency of 1.53% in the current Sicilian and Southern Italian genetic pool, but the typical Maghrebin core haplotype 13-14-30-24-9-11-13 has been found in only two out of the five E-M81 individuals. These results, along with the negligible contribution from North-African populations revealed by the admixture-like plot analysis, suggest only a marginal impact of trans-Mediterranean gene flows on the current Sicilian and Southern Italian genetic pool.

Auton et al. (2009) found that South West Europe had the highest proportion in Europe of haplotypes that are shared with sub-Saharan Africa (represented by Yoruba), and significantly more relative to South East Europe.

=== mtDNA ===
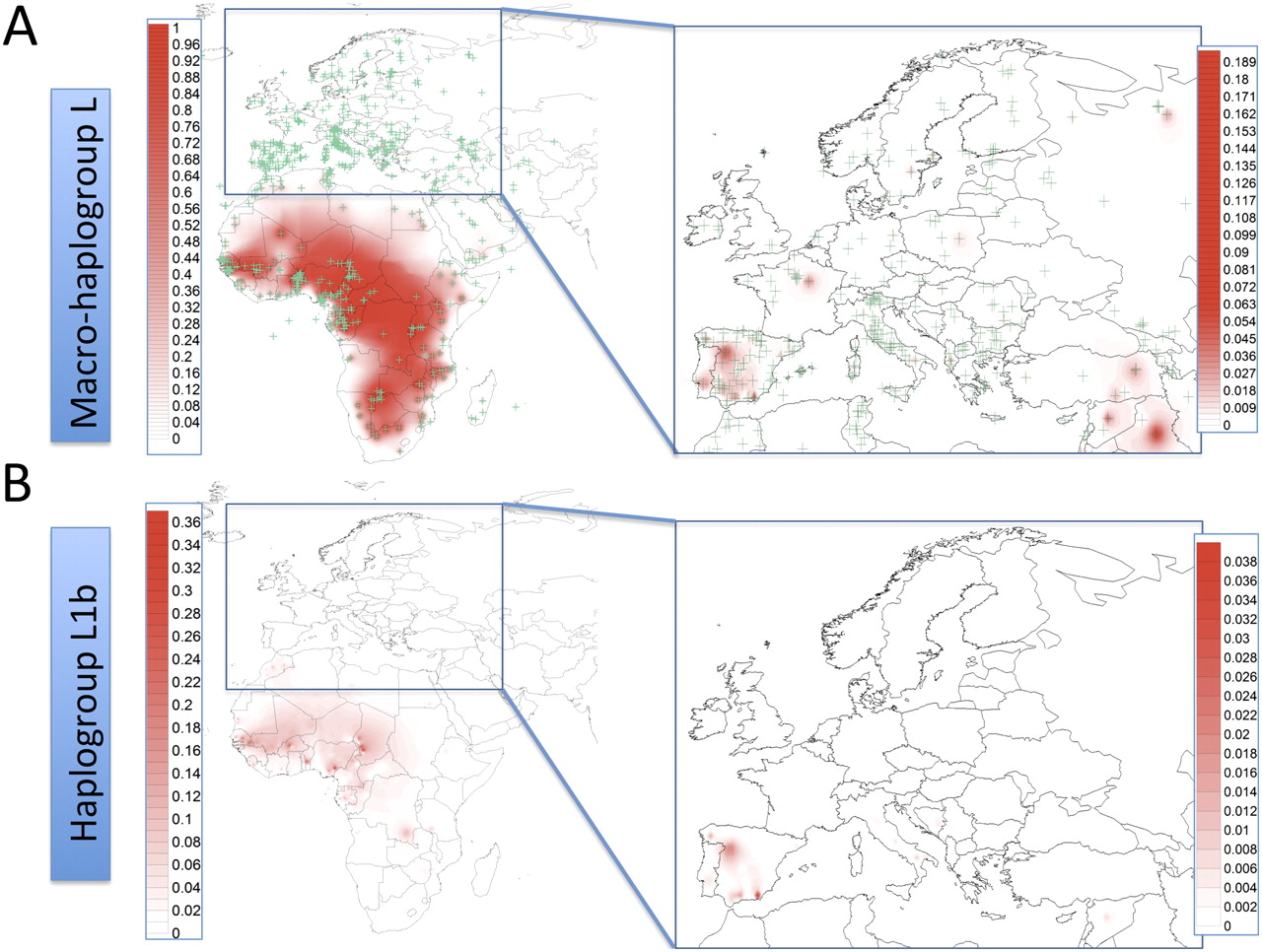
Spatial haplogroup distribution of sub-Saharan African lineages in Europe.

Haplogroup L lineages are relatively infrequent (1% or less) throughout Europe with the exception of Iberia (Spain and Portugal), where frequencies as high as 22% have been reported, and some regions of Southern Italy, where frequencies as high as 2% and 3% have been found. About 65% of the European L lineages most likely arrived in rather recent historical times (Romanization period, Arab conquest of the Iberian Peninsula and Sicily, Atlantic slave trade) and about 35% of L mtDNAs form European-specific subclades, revealing that there was gene flow from Sub-Saharan Africa toward Europe as early as 11,000 years ago.

In Iberia the mean frequency of haplogroup L lineages reaches 3.83%; the frequency is higher in Portugal (5.83%) than in Spain (2.9% average), and without parallel in the rest of Europe. In both countries, frequencies vary widely between regions, but with increased frequencies observed for Madeira (insular Portugal), southern Portugal, Córdoba (southern Spain), Huelva (southern Spain), Canary Islands (insular Spain), Extremadura (western Spain) and Leon (western Spain). In the Autonomous regions of Portugal (i.e. Madeira and the Azores), L haplogroups constituted about 13% of the lineages in Madeira, significantly more than in the Azores. In the Canary Islands, frequencies have been reported at 6.6%. Regarding Iberia, current debates are concerned with whether these lineages are associated with prehistoric migrations, the Islamic occupation of Iberia, or the slave trade. African lineages in Iberia were predominantly the result of the Atlantic slave trade. Most of the L lineages in Iberia matched Northwest African L lineages rather than contemporary Sub-Saharan L lineages. This pattern indicates that most of the Sub-Saharan L lineages entered Iberia in prehistoric times rather than during the slave trade. According to Sub-Saharan lineages found in Iberia matched lineages from diverse regions in Africa. This pattern is more compatible with a recent arrival of these lineages after slave trading began in the 15th century. Alternative scenarios that invoke much older and demographically more significant introductions have been proposed or a substantial role of the Roman and/or Islamic periods on the introduction of Sub-Saharan lineages seem unlikely. Extracted DNA from human remains that were exhumed from old burial sites in Al-Andalus, Spain, The remains date to between the 12th and 13th centuries. The frequency of Sub-Saharan lineages detected in the medieval samples was 14.6% and 8.3% in the present population of Priego de Cordoba. The Muslim occupation and prehistoric migrations before the Muslim occupation would have been the source of these lineages. The highest frequencies of Sub-Saharan lineages found so far in Europe were observed in the comarca of Sayago (18.2%) which is "comparable to that described for the South of Portugal".

In Italy, haplogroup L lineages are present at lower frequencies than in Iberia and are detected only in certain regions: Latium, Volterra, Basilicata, and Sicily.

In eastern Europe, haplogroup L lineages are present at very low frequencies. Though a high diversity of African mtDNA lineages have been detected, few lineages have accumulated enough mutations in Europe to form monophyletic clusters. The monophyletic clusters L1b and L3b have an estimated age no greater than 6,500 years. African L1b, L2a, L3b, L3d and M1 clades in Slavic populations have been identified at low frequencies. L1b, L3b and L3d had matches with West African populations, indicating that these lineages probably entered Europe through Iberia. One lineage, L2a1a, found in Czechs and Slovaks, appeared to be much older, indicating that it may have entered Europe in prehistoric times. This clade is distinct from the branch of L2a1 called L2a1l2a that is found in individuals of Ashkenazi heritage from central and eastern Europe and less frequently in non-Jewish Poles. L2a lineages are widespread throughout Africa; as a result, the origins of this lineage are uncertain.

Haplogroup M1 is also found in Europe at low frequencies. Haplogroup M1 had a frequency of 0.3%. The origins of haplogroup M1 have yet to be conclusively established.

A prehistoric episode from the Early Holocene is likely to be a contributor to some of the U6 and L lingeages present in Mediterranean Europe.

=== Frequencies of haplogroup L lineages ===
Country	Region	Number tested	Study	%
Europe	Continent-wide (excl. Tuscany)	10,589	Achilli et al. (2007)	0.79%
South Iberia	Spain & Portugal	310	Casas et al. (2006)	7.40%
Spain	Countrywide	312	Álvarez et al. (2007)	2.90%
Spain	Central Spain	50	Plaza et al. (2003)	4.00%
Spain	North-West Spain	216	Achilli et al. (2007)	3.70%
Spain	Basque Country	156	Achilli et al. (2007)	0.64%
Spain	Galicia	92	Pereira et al. (2005)	3.30%
Spain	Zamora	214	Álvarez et al. (2010)	4.70%
Spain	Sayago	33	Álvarez et al. (2010)	18.18%
Spain	Cordoba	108	Casas et al. (2006)	8.30%
Spain	Huelva	135	Hernandez et al. (2014)	5.70%
Spain	Catalonia	101	Álvarez-Iglesias et al. (2009)	2.97%
Spain	Balearic Islands	231	Picornell et al. (2005)	2.20%
Spain	Canary Islands	300	Brehm et al. (2003)	6.60%
Portugal	Countrywide	594	Achilli et al. (2007)	6.90%
Portugal	Countrywide	1429	Barral-Arca et al. (2016)	6.16%
Portugal	Countrywide	549	Pereira et al. (2005)	5.83%
Portugal	North	100	Pereira et al. (2010)	5.00%
Portugal	Center	82	Pereira et al. (2010)	9.70%
Portugal	Center	82	Plaza et al. (2003)	6.10%
Portugal	South	195	Brehm et al. (2003)	11.30%
Portugal	South	303	Achilli et al. (2007)	10.80%
Portugal	Coruche	160	Pereira et al. (2010)	8.70%
Portugal	Pias	75	Pereira et al. (2010)	3.90%
Portugal	Alcácer do Sal	50	Pereira et al. (2010)	22.00%
Portugal	Azores	179	Brehm et al. (2003)	3.40%
Portugal	Madeira	155	Brehm et al. (2003)	12.90%
Portugal	Madeira	153	Fernandes et al. (2006)	12.40%
Italy	Countrywide	583	Brisighelli et al. (2012)	1.20%
Italy	Countrywide	865	Boattini et al. (2013)	0.00%
Italy	Countrywide	240	Babalini et al. (2005)	0.40%
Italy	Tuscany	322	Achilli et al. (2007)	1.86%
Italy	Tuscany	49	Plaza et al. (2003)	2.00%
Italy	Volterra	114	Achilli et al. (2007)	2.63%
Italy	Latium	138	Achilli et al. (2007)	2.90%
Italy	Marche	813	Achilli et al. (2007)	0.98%
Italy	Central Italy	83	Plaza et al. (2003)	1.20%
Italy	Lombardy	177	Achilli et al. (2007)	0.00%
Italy	Piedmont	169	Achilli et al. (2007)	0.00%
Italy	Sardinia	258	Pardo et al. (2012)	0.40%
Italy	Sardinia	73	Plaza et al. (2003)	2.80%
Italy	Sardinia	85	Sanna et al. (2011)	0.00%
Italy	Sardinia (Ogliastra)	475	Fraumene C et al. (2003)	0.00%
Italy	Sardinia	96	Morelli et al. (1999)	0.00%
Italy	Campania (South Italy)	313	Achilli et al. (2007)	0.32%
Italy	Basilicata (South Italy)	92	Ottoni et al. (2009)	2.20%
Italy	Apulia & Calabria (South Italy)	226	Achilli et al. (2007)	0.00%
Italy	Southern Italy	115	Sarno et al. (2014)	0.00%
Italy	Southern Italy	37	Plaza et al. (2003)	8.10%
Italy	Sicily	106	Cali et al. (2003)	0.94%
Italy	Sicily	105	Achilli et al. (2007)	1.90%
Italy	Sicily	169	Plaza et al. (2003)	0.60%
Italy	Sicily	198	Sarno et al. (2014)	1.01%
Italy	Sicily	465	Romano et al. (2003)	0.65%
Greece	Crete	202	Achilli et al. (2007)	0.99%
Greece	Crete	283	Martinez et al. (2008)	0.00%
Greece	Macedonia	125	Richards et al. (2000)	0.00%
Greece	Countrywide	155	Achilli et al. (2007)	0.00%
Cyprus	Cyprus	91	Irwin et al. (2008)	3.30%
United Kingdom	England	335	Achilli et al. (2007)	0.60%
United Kingdom	Wales	92	Achilli et al. (2007)	0.00%
Finland	Countrywide	121	Achilli et al. (2007)	0.82%
Germany	Countrywide	335	Achilli et al. (2007)	0.30%
Ireland	Countrywide	300	Achilli et al. (2007)	0.00%
France	Countrywide	332	Achilli et al. (2007)	0.30%
Bulgaria	Countrywide	141	Achilli et al. (2007)	0.71%
Bosnia and Herzegovina	Countrywide	144	Achilli et al. (2007)	0.69%

In an analysis which also contains an admixture data but no cluster membership coefficients, shows little to no Sub-Saharan African influence in a wide array of European samples, i.e. Albanians, Austrians, Belgians, Bosnians, Bulgarians, Croatians, Cypriots, Czechs, Danes, Finns, Frenchmen, Germans, Greeks, Hungarians, Irish, Italians, Albanians in Kosovo, Lithuanians, Latvians, Macedonians, Netherlanders, Norwegians, Poles, Portuguese, Romanians, Russians, Scots, Serbians, Slovaks, Slovenians, Spaniards, Swedes, Swiss (German, French and Italian), Ukrainians, subjects of the United Kingdom, and Yugoslavians.

Haplogroup U6, to which a North African origin has been attributed, is largely distributed among Mozabites (28.2%) and Mauritanians (20%). In other northwest Africans, the frequency of U6 ranges from 4.2% in Tunisians to 8% in Moroccan Arabs. In Europe, U6 is most common in Spain and Portugal.

=== Frequencies of haplogroup U6 lineages ===
Country	Region	Number tested	Study	%
Italy	Countrywide	583	Brisighelli et al. (2012)	0.8%
Italy	Mainland	411	Plaza et al. (2003)	0.0%
Italy	Countrywide	865	Boattini et al. (2013)	0.35%
Italy	Sicily	169	Plaza et al. (2003)	0.6%
Italy	Sicily	106	Maca-Meyer et al. (2003).	0.94%
Italy	Lazio	52	Babalini et al. (2005)	5.8%
Italy	Abruzzo (Molise)	73	Babalini et al. (2005)	0%
Italy	Campania	48	Babalini et al. (2005)	0%
Italy	Volterra (Tuscany)	114	Achilli et al. (2007)	0.00%
Italy	Murlo (Tuscany)	86	Achilli et al. (2007)	1.20%
Italy	Casentino (Tuscany)	122	Achilli et al. (2007)	0.80%
Italy	Sicily	105	Achilli et al. (2007)	0.95%
Italy	Latium	138	Achilli et al. (2007)	0.00%
Italy	Lombardy	177	Achilli et al. (2007)	0.00%
Italy	Piedmont	169	Achilli et al. (2007)	0.00%
Italy	Marche	813	Achilli et al. (2007)	0.25%
Italy	Campania	313	Achilli et al. (2007)	1.28%
Italy	Apulia-Calabria	226	Achilli et al. (2007)	1.33%
Italy	Sardinia	370	Achilli et al. (2007)	0.27%
Spain	Central Spain	50	Plaza et al. (2003)	2.0%
Spain	Galicia	103	Plaza et al. (2003)	1.9%
Spain	Galicia	135	Maca-Meyer et al. (2003)	2.2%
Spain	Catalonia	118	Maca-Meyer et al. (2003)	1.6%
Spain	Huelva	135	Hernandez et al. (2014)	8.8%
Spain	Maragatos	49	Maca-Meyer et al. (2003)	8.1%
Spain	Canary Islands	300	Brehm et al. (2003)	14.0%
Portugal	Countrywide	54	Plaza et al. (2003)	5.6%
Portugal	North Portugal	184	Maca-Meyer et al. (2003)	4.3%
Portugal	Central Portugal	161	Brehm et al. (2003)	1.9%
Portugal	Madeira	155	Brehm et al. (2003)	3.9%
Portugal	Madeira	153	Fernandes et al. (2006)	3.3%
Iberia	Spain and Portugal	887	Plaza et al. (2003)	1.8%

== GM immunoglobulin allotypes ==
Further studies have shown that the presence of haplotype GM*1,17 23' 5* in southern Europe. This haplotype is considered a genetic marker of Sub-Saharan Africa, where it shows frequencies of about 80%. Whereas, in non-Mediterranean European populations, that value is about 0.3%, in Spain the average figure for this African haplotype is nearly eight times greater (though still at a low level) at 2.4%, and it shows a peak at 4.5% in Galicia. Values of around 4% have also been found in Huelva and in the Aran valley in the Pyrenees. Although some researchers have associated African traces in Iberia to Islamic conquest, the presence of GM*1,17 23' 5* haplotype in Iberia may in fact be due to more ancient processes as well as more recent ones through the introduction of genes from slaves sold from Africa.

In Sicily the North African haplotype Gm 5*;1;17; ranges from 1.56% at Valledolmo to 5.5% at Alia. The hypothesis is that the presence of this haplotype suggests past contacts with people from North Africa. The introduction of African markers could be due to the Phoenician colonization at the end of the second millennium B.C. or to the more recent Arab conquest (8th–9th centuries A.D.).

== Paleoanthropology ==
The migration of farmers from the Middle East into Europe is believed to have significantly influenced the genetic profile of present-day Europeans. Some recent studies have focused on corroborating current genetic data with the archeological evidence from Europe, the Middle East, and Africa. The Natufian culture, which existed about 12,000 years ago or more, has been the subject of various archeological investigations, as it is generally believed to be the source of the European and North African Neolithic.

According to one hypothesis, the Natufian culture emerged from the mixing of two Stone Age cultures: (1) the Kebaran, a culture indigenous to the Levant, and (2) the Mushabian, a culture introduced into the Levant from North Africa†. It is suggested that the Mushabian culture originated in Africa, given that archeological sites with Mushabian industries in the Nile Valley predate those in the Levant†. The Mushabians would have then moved into the Sinai from the Nile Delta bringing with them their technologies†. The overpopulation in Northeast Africa contributed to the development of the Natufian adaptation, which resulted in agriculture becoming a new way of sustenance.

From an analysis of human remains from the Natufian culture, there is evidence of Sub-Saharan influences in the Natufian samples. These influences would have been diluted by the interbreeding of the Neolithic farmers from the Near East are associated with the indigenous foragers in Europe. The Sub-Saharan influences detected in the Natufian samples with the migration of E1b1b lineages from Northeast Africa to the Levant and then into Europe.

According to an ancient DNA analyses on Natufian skeletal remains from present-day northern Israel, the Natufians in fact shared no evident genetic affinity to sub-Saharan Africans. It was not possible to test for affinity in the Natufians to early North African populations using present-day North Africans as a reference because present-day North Africans owe most of their ancestry to back-migration from Eurasia. The Natufians carried the Y-DNA (paternal) haplogroups E1b1b1b2(xE1b1b1b2a,E1b1b1b2b) (2/5; 40%), CT (2/5; 40%), and E1b1(xE1b1a1,E1b1b1b1) (1/5; 20%). In terms of autosomal DNA, these Natufians carried around 50% of the Basal Eurasian (BE) and 50% of Western Eurasian Unknown Hunter Gather (UHG) components. However, they were slightly distinct from the northern Anatolian populations that contributed to the peopling of Europe, who had higher Western Hunter-Gatherer (WHG) inferred ancestry. Natufians were strongly genetically differentiated from Neolithic Iranian farmers from the Zagros Mountains, caring up to 62% of the Basal Eurasians and Ancient North Eurasians (ANE). This might suggest that different strains of Basal Eurasians contributed to Natufians and Zagros farmers, as both Natufians and Zagros farmers descended from different populations of local hunter gatherers. Mating between Natufians, other Neolithic Levantines, Caucasus Hunter Gatherers (CHG), Anatolian and Iranian farmers is believed to have decreased genetic variability among later populations in the Middle East. The scientists suggest that the Levantine early farmers may have spread southward into East Africa, bringing along Western Eurasian and Basal Eurasian ancestral components separate from that which would arrive later in North Africa.

† The Mushabian industry is now known to have originated in the Levant from the previous lithic industries of the region of Lake Lisan. The Mushabian industry was originally thought to have originated in Africa because the microburin technique was not yet known to be much older in the eastern Levant. Currently there is no known industry to connect with the African migration that occurred 14,700 years ago, but it no doubt caused a population expansion in the Negev and Sinai which would not have accommodated an increase in population with the meager resources of a steppe/desert climate. Since all of the known cultures in the Levant at the time of the migration originated in the Levant and an archaeological culture cannot be associated with it, there must have been assimilation into a Levantine culture at the onset, most likely the Ramonian which was present in the Sinai 14,700 years ago.

== See also ==
- African immigration to Europe (contemporary history)
- Genetic history of the Middle East
- Genetic history of North Africa
- Genetic history of Europe
- Barbary slave trade
- Abkhazians of African descent
