= Genetic history of Egypt =

The genetic history of Egypt reflects its geographical location at the crossroads of several major biocultural areas: North Africa, the Sahara/Sahel, the Middle East, the Mediterranean and sub-Saharan Africa.

== Genetic studies on ancient Egyptians ==
Egyptologist Barry Kemp has noted that DNA studies can only provide firm conclusions about the population of ancient Egypt if the sample results are of a significant number of individuals and represent a broad geographical and chronological range. According to historian William Stiebling and archaeologist Susan N. Helft, conflicting DNA analysis on recent genetic samples such as the Amarna royal mummies has led to a lack of consensus on the genetic makeup of the ancient Egyptians and their geographic origins.

=== 2012 study of Ramesses III ===
In 2012, two mummies of two 20th dynasty individuals, Ramesses III and "Unknown Man E" believed to be Ramesses III's son Pentawer, were analysed by Albert Zink, Yehia Z Gad, and a team of researchers under Zahi Hawass. Genetic kinship analyses revealed identical haplotypes in both mummies; using the Whit Athey's haplogroup predictor, the Y chromosomal haplogroup E1b1a was predicted.

In another study by the same authors in 2020, which once again deals with the paternal lineage of Ramesses III and the "Unknown Man E" (possibly Pentawer), E1b1a shows its highest frequencies in modern West African populations (~80%) and Central Africa (~60%).

=== 2017 DNA study of Mummies at Abusir el-Meleq ===
A study published in 2017 by Schuenemann et al. extracted DNA from 151 Egyptian mummies, whose remains were recovered from Abusir el-Meleq in Middle Egypt. The samples are from the time periods: Late New Kingdom, Ptolemaic, and Roman. Complete mtDNA sequences from 90 samples as well as genome-wide data from three ancient Egyptian individuals were successfully obtained and were compared with other ancient and modern datasets. The study used 135 modern Egyptian samples. The ancient Egyptian individuals in their own dataset possessed highly similar mtDNA haplogroup profiles, and cluster together, supporting genetic continuity across the 1,300-year transect. Modern Egyptians shared this mtDNA haplogroup profile, but also carried 8% more African component. A wide range of mtDNA haplogroups was found including clades of J, U, H, HV, M, R0, R2, K, T, L, I, N, X and W. In addition three ancient Egyptian individuals were analysed for Y-DNA, two were assigned to Middle Eastern haplogroup J and one to haplogroup E1b1b1a1b2. Both of these haplogroups are carried by modern Egyptians, and also common among Afroasiatic speakers in Northern Africa, Eastern Africa and the Middle East. The researchers cautioned that the examined ancient Egyptian specimens may not be representative of those of all ancient Egyptians since they were from a single archaeological site from the northern part of Egypt. The analyses revealed that Ancient Egyptians had higher affinities with Near Eastern and European populations than modern Egyptians do, likely due to the 8% increase in the African component found in modern Egyptians. However, comparative data from a contemporary population under Roman rule in Anatolia, did not reveal a closer relationship to the ancient Egyptians from the Roman period. "Genetic continuity between ancient and modern Egyptians cannot be ruled out despite this more recent sub-Saharan African influx, while continuity with modern Ethiopians is not supported".

The absolute estimates of sub-Saharan African ancestry in these three ancient Egyptian individuals ranged from 6 to 15%, and the absolute estimates of sub-Saharan African ancestry in the 135 modern Egyptian samples ranged from 14 to 21%, which show an 8% increase in African component. The age of the ancient Egyptian samples suggests that this 8% increase in African component occurred predominantly within the last 2000 years. The 135 modern Egyptian samples were: 100 from modern Egyptians taken from a study by Pagani et al., and 35 from el-Hayez Western Desert Oasis taken from a study by Kujanova et al. The 35 samples from el-Hayez Western Desert Oasis, whose population is described by the Kujanova et al. study as a mixed, relatively isolated, demographically small but autochthonous population, were already known from that study to have a relatively high sub-Saharan African component, which is more than 11% higher than the African component in the 100 modern Egyptian samples.

Verena Schuenemann and the authors of this study suggest a high level of genetic interaction with the Near East since ancient times, probably going back to Prehistoric Egypt although the oldest mummies at the site were from the New Kingdom: "Our data seem to indicate close admixture and affinity at a much earlier date, which is unsurprising given the long and complex connections between Egypt and the Middle East. These connections date back to Prehistory and occurred at a variety of scales, including overland and maritime commerce, diplomacy, immigration, invasion and deportation".

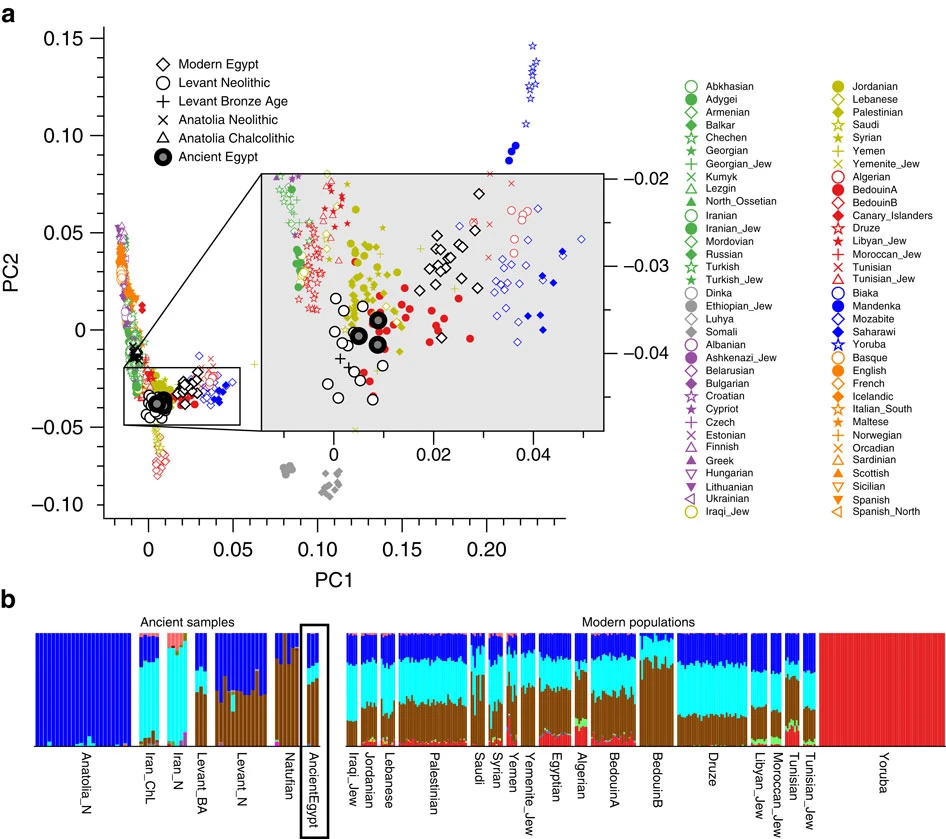
PCA and ADMIXTURE analysis of three ancient Egyptian samples and other modern and ancient populations.

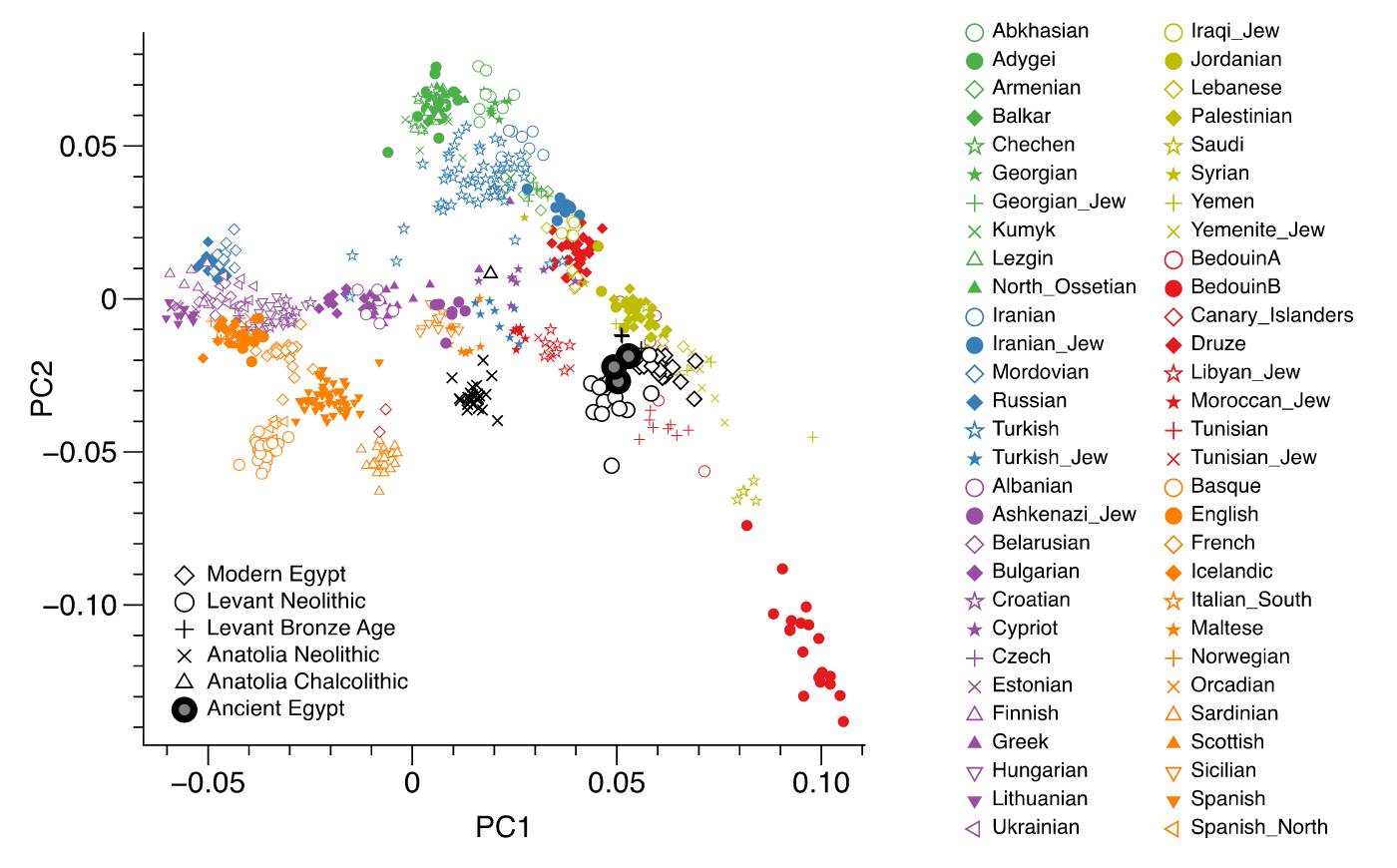
PCA using only European samples based on the nuclear genome-wide data obtained on three ancient Egyptian samples.

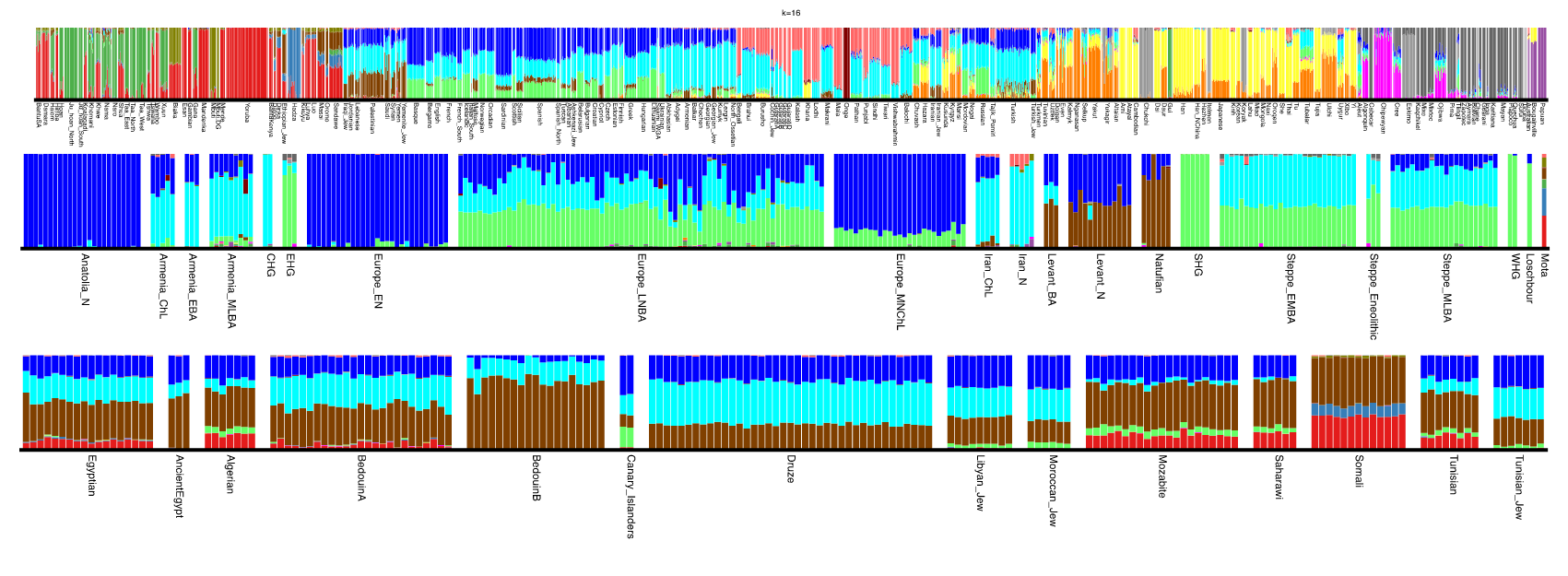
Complete results from the ADMIXTURE analysis using all samples in the merged data set, from the 2017 study by Schuenemann et al.

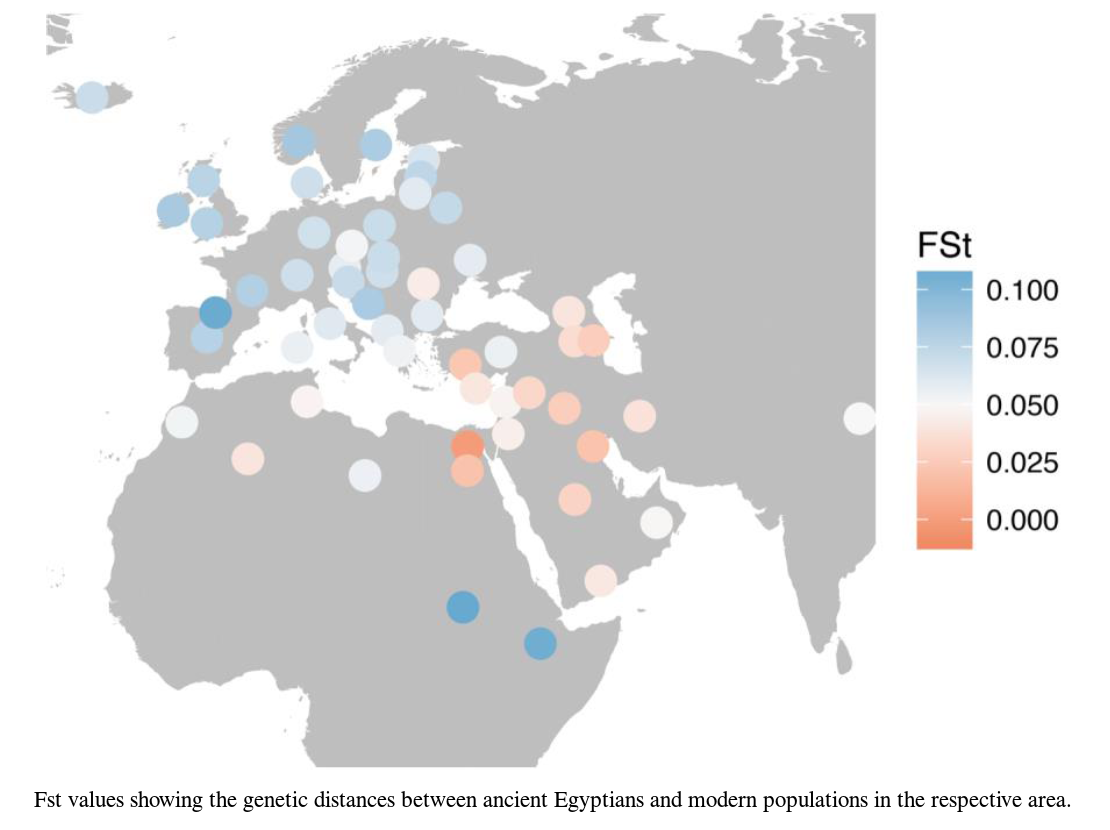
F_{ST} values showing the genetic distances of HVR-1 (mtDNA) between 90 ancient Egyptians and modern populations. Blue values depict higher genetic distances, red values depict lower genetic distances between the ancient Egyptian population and modern populations in the respective area.

==== Responses to the 2017 DNA study ====
The 2017 study has generated academic responses from scholars from other related disciplines, remarking on the conclusions of the study from a multi-disciplinary approach.

In 2020, Stuart Tyson Smith, professor of anthropology at UC Santa Barbara, stated: "Additionally, they are oblivious to the fact that the mouth of the Faiyum Oasis, where the sample was located, is well known, through historical documents, as an area where Middle Eastern people, like the Sherden, were settled as a reward for military service, during the late New Kingdom, about 1300 to 1070 BCE. This provides a far more likely explanation for any stronger affinity to Middle Eastern populations, and weaker ties to Sub-Saharan populations than modern Egyptians in their sample, but was not even considered."

In 2021, Gourdine et al disputed Scheunemann et al's claim, in an unpublished article, that the increase in the sub-Saharan component in the modern Egyptian samples resulted from the trans-Saharan slave trade. Instead they argued that the sub-Saharan "genetic affinities" may be attributed to "early settlers" and "the relevant sub-Saharan genetic markers do not correspond with the geography of known trade routes".

In 2022, biological anthropologist S.O.Y. Keita argued that there were problems with the study's approaches and conclusions such as over-generalizations and a failure to consider alternative explanations. Particularly, he raised issues with the comparative samples from West Africa as a proxy group and generalisations about geographical Egypt and population origins from the sample results. He also drew attention to the fact that the authors draw inference on migrations in line with their Bayesian statistical approach rather than integrate other data into their explanations about the population history.

In 2022, archaeologist Danielle Candelora stated that there were several limitations with the 2017 Scheunemann et al. study such as "new (untested) sampling methods, small sample size and problematic comparative data".

In 2023, Stiebling and Helft acknowledged that the 2017 study had performed the largest study on ancient Egyptians but noted that the findings still derived from a small sample of mummies from one site in Middle Egypt dating to the New Kingdom and later periods. They also stated that this study could not represent earlier populations or Egyptians from Upper Egypt who were geographically closer to Sub-Saharan populations.

In 2023, Christopher Ehret argued that the conclusions of the 2017 study were based on insufficiently small sample sizes, and that the authors had a biased interpretation of the genetic data. Ehret also criticised the Schuenemann article for asserting that there was "no sub-Saharan genetic component" in the Egyptian population and cited previous genetic analysis which had identified the Horn of Africa as the origin of the E-M35 paternal haplogroup.

In 2025, UNESCO scholars Augustin Holl and Jean Gourdine both presented similar forms of criticisms, in the international General History of Africa Volume IX publication, of the 2017 Scheunemann study in terms of its geographical coverage, general conclusions on the population of Egypt and methodological approach. Gourdine argued that there were a number of biases in the interpretation and the conclusions conflicted with other analysis such as the Amarna STR analysis, and evidence of identifiable African haplogroups such as E1b1b1, JK2955 (haplogroup L3) and JK2963 (haplogroup M1a1i), which preceded the trans-Saharan slave trade in Egypt.

==== Later findings ====
A 2020 study was conducted on ancient samples from Lebanon. Two individuals who lived in Lebanon around 500 BCE did not cluster with their contemporary Lebanese population. The study used the same Egyptian samples from the 2017 Schuenemann et al. study to further test these two individuals. One of these two individuals was a female who formed a clade with the three ancient Egyptian individuals from Schuenemann et al., implying that she shared all of her ancestry with them or a genetically equivalent population. The other one was a male who derived ~70% of his ancestry from a population related to the female and ~30% from a population related to ancient Levantines. Further testing suggests that the female was an Egyptian woman and the male was her son from a man who himself had both Egyptian and Lebanese ancestries.

=== 2018 study of Nakht-Ankh and Khnum-Nakht ===
The tomb of two high-status Egyptians, Nakht-Ankh and Khnum-Nakht, was discovered by Egyptian workmen directed by Sir William Flinders Petrie and Ernest Mackay in 1907. Nakht-Ankh and Khnum-Nakht lived during the 12th Dynasty (1985–1773 BCE) in Middle Egypt and were aged 20 years apart. Their tomb has been called Tomb of Two Brothers because the mummies were buried adjacent to one other and inscriptions on the coffins mention the female name Khnum-Aa, who is described as 'lady of the house' and referred to as the mother of both Nakht-Ankh and Khnum-Nakht. The Y-chromosome sequences were not complete, but the Y-chromosome SNPs indicated that they had different fathers, suggesting that they were half-brothers. The SNP identities were consistent with mtDNA haplogroup M1a1 with 88.05–91.27% degree of confidence, thus "confirming the African origins of the two individuals" according to the study authors, based on their maternal lineage.

=== 2018 study of Djehutynakht ===
In 2018 the mummified head of Djehutynakht was analysed for mitochondrial DNA. Djehutynakht was the nomarch of the Hare nome in Upper Egypt during the 11th or 12th Dynasty in the early Middle Kingdom period, c. 2000 BC. Two laboratories independently analysed Djehutynakht's DNA and found that he belonged to the mtDNA haplogroup U5b2b5, described by the lead author Odile Loreille as "a European haplogroup". U5 is thought to have originated in Europe, and U5b2b5 has been found in ancient European samples dating from the Neolithic onwards. U5b2b5 has also been found in 10 samples from Christian Period Nubia, and a related European sequence (U5b2c1) has been observed in an ancient sample from Carthage (6th century BC). Among ancient Egyptian samples the Djehutynakht sequence resembles a U5a lineage from sample JK2903, a 2000-year-old skeleton from the Abusir el-Meleq site in Egypt. Haplogroup U5 is found in modern Egyptians, and is found in modern Egyptian Berbers from the Siwa Oasis in Egypt. A 2009 study by Coudray et al. recorded haplogroup U5 at 16.7% in the Siwa Oasis in Egypt, whereas haplogroup U6 is more common in other Berber populations to the west of Egypt.

=== 2020 study on two Egyptian child mummies ===
A study on male child mummies from the Greco-Roman period originating in the Memphite or Luxor area, revealed that the mtDNA for one was T2c1a and the other HV. Identical or phylogenetically close derivatives of these lineages are present in both ancient and modern Egyptians, as well as among several present-day populations of the Near East and North Africa. The researchers noted that mtDNA alone is not enough to reach any precise conclusion about the origin of an individual, but the results are in accordance with an Egyptian origin. The ages of the two mummified corpses ranged from 11–15 years old, and 2–4 years old.

=== 2020 study of Tutankhamun and other mummies of the 18th Dynasty ===
A 2020 study by Gad, Hawass, et al. analysed mitochondrial and Y-chromosomal haplogroups from Tutankhamun's family members of the 18th Dynasty, using comprehensive control procedures to ensure quality results. The study found that the Y-chromosome haplogroup of the family was R1b. Haplogroup R1b is carried by modern Egyptians. Modern Egypt is also the only African country that is known to harbour all three R1 subtypes, including R1b-M269. The Y-chromosome profiles for Tutankhamun and Amenhotep III were incomplete and the analysis produced differing probability figures despite having concordant allele results. Because the relationships of these two mummies with the KV55 mummy (identified as Akhenaten) had previously been confirmed in an earlier study, the haplogroup prediction of both mummies could be derived from the full profile of the KV55 data. Genetic analysis indicated the following haplogroups for the 18th Dynasty:

- Amenhotep III: YDNA R1b & mtDNA H2b.
- Tutankhamun: YDNA R1b & mtDNA K.
- Akhenaten: YDNA R1b & mtDNA K.
- Tiye: mtDNA K.
- Yuya: YDNA G2a & mtDNA K.
- Thuya: mtDNA K.

Both Y-DNA haplogroups R1b and G2a, as well as both mtDNA haplogroups H and K, are carried by modern Egyptians.

=== 2020 study of Takabuti ===
In 2020 the mummy of Takabuti was tested for mitochondrial DNA. Takabuti was a noblewoman from Thebes in Upper Egypt who lived during the 25th Dynasty, c. 660 BC. Analysis of her DNA revealed that she belonged to the mtDNA haplogroup H4a1. The study states that "the H super-haplogroup is the most common mtDNA lineage in Europe and is found also in parts of present-day Africa and western Asia". Haplogroup H is also carried by modern Egyptians, the subgroup H4 in particular, along with H2a1 and H13a1, account for 42% of H lineages in modern Egypt, with H4 accounting for 16.7% of H lineages in modern Egypt.

=== 2020 study of mummies at the Kurchatov Institute ===
In 2020, three mummies, dating from the 1st millennium BCE, from the Pushkin Museum of Arts collection were tested at the Kurchatov Institute of Moscow for their mitochondrial and Y-chromosomal haplogroups. One of the mummies was found to belong to the Y-chromosomal haplogroup R1b1a1b (R1b-M269), which originated in Eastern Europe, and another to the Y-chromosome haplogroup E1b1b1a1b2a4b5a, which originated in North Africa. They also belonged to mtDNA haplogroups L3h1 and N5, common in Africans and Middle Easterners, respectively. The third mummy was found to belong to mtDNA haplogroup N, which is widely distributed across Eurasia as well as eastern and northeastern Africa.

=== 2022 and 2025 commentary on mummies of the 18th and 20th Dynasties ===
In a comment on Hawas et al. (2010& 2012), the anthropologist S.O.Y. Keita pointed out, based on inserting the data into the PopAffiliator online calculator, which only calculates affinity to East Asia, Eurasia, and sub-Saharan Africa, but not to North Africa or the Near East, for instance, that Ramesses III and the Amarna ancient royal family (including Tutankhamun) showed "an affinity with sub-Saharan Africans in one affinity analysis, which does not mean that they lacked other affiliations — an important point that typological thinking obscures. Also, different data and algorithms might give different results, which would illustrate the complexity of biological heritage and its interpretation."

Christopher Ehret, David Schoenbrun, Steven A Brandt and Shomarka Keita (2025) made further commentary on the Amarna results in a multidisciplinary review concerning Ehret's Afrasian theory that Afroasiatic languages originated in East Africa (as opposed to North Africa or the Near East), noting the R1b M89 haplogroup subtype identified among the three Amarna pharaohs (Tutankhamun, Amenhotep III and Akhenaten) was not further specified. The authors also stated that the R1b haplogroup usually interpreted as indicating a back migration to Africa from or via the Near East could have been attributed to Asian back migration or trans-Saharan connections as the genetic marker is found at relative high frequencies among Chadic populations, although the authors cautioned that the specific R1b-V88 lineage found most commonly in Chadic speaking population was not determined to be present in the Egyptian 18th dynasty pharaohs. Referencing a Short Tandem Report (STR) autosomal background analysis on the Amarna royal mummies, performed by Keita in an earlier publication, the authors considered this analysis could suggest closer trans-Saharan connections. Ehret et al also disclosed through personal communication with the Gad team that "other eighteenth dynasty lineages in the Amarna period were found to be E1b1a (Gad et al 2020)" The authors further postulated that association of the palaeolithic Asian lineage (R1B) and an affiliation that is tropical African (E1b1a) is an example of admixture found in some Nile Valley populations, and that a mixture of lineages could illustrate Egypt being near a crossroads.

In 2025, biochemist Jean-Philippe Gourdine reviewed genetic data on the Ancient Egyptian populations in the international scholarly publication, General History of Africa Volume IX. Expanding on a previous STR analysis performed on the Amarna mummies, Gourdine stated the analysis had found "that they had strong affinities with current sub-Saharan populations: 41 per cent to 93.9 per cent for sub-Saharan Africa, compared to 4.6 per cent to 41 per cent for Eurasia and 0.3 per cent to 16 per cent for Asia (Gourdine, 2018)." He also referenced comparable analysis conducted by DNA Tribes, which specialised in genetic genealogy and had large datasets, with the latter having identified strong affinities between the Amarna royal mummies and Sub-Saharan African populations.

=== 2025 Old Kingdom male from Nuwayrat ===
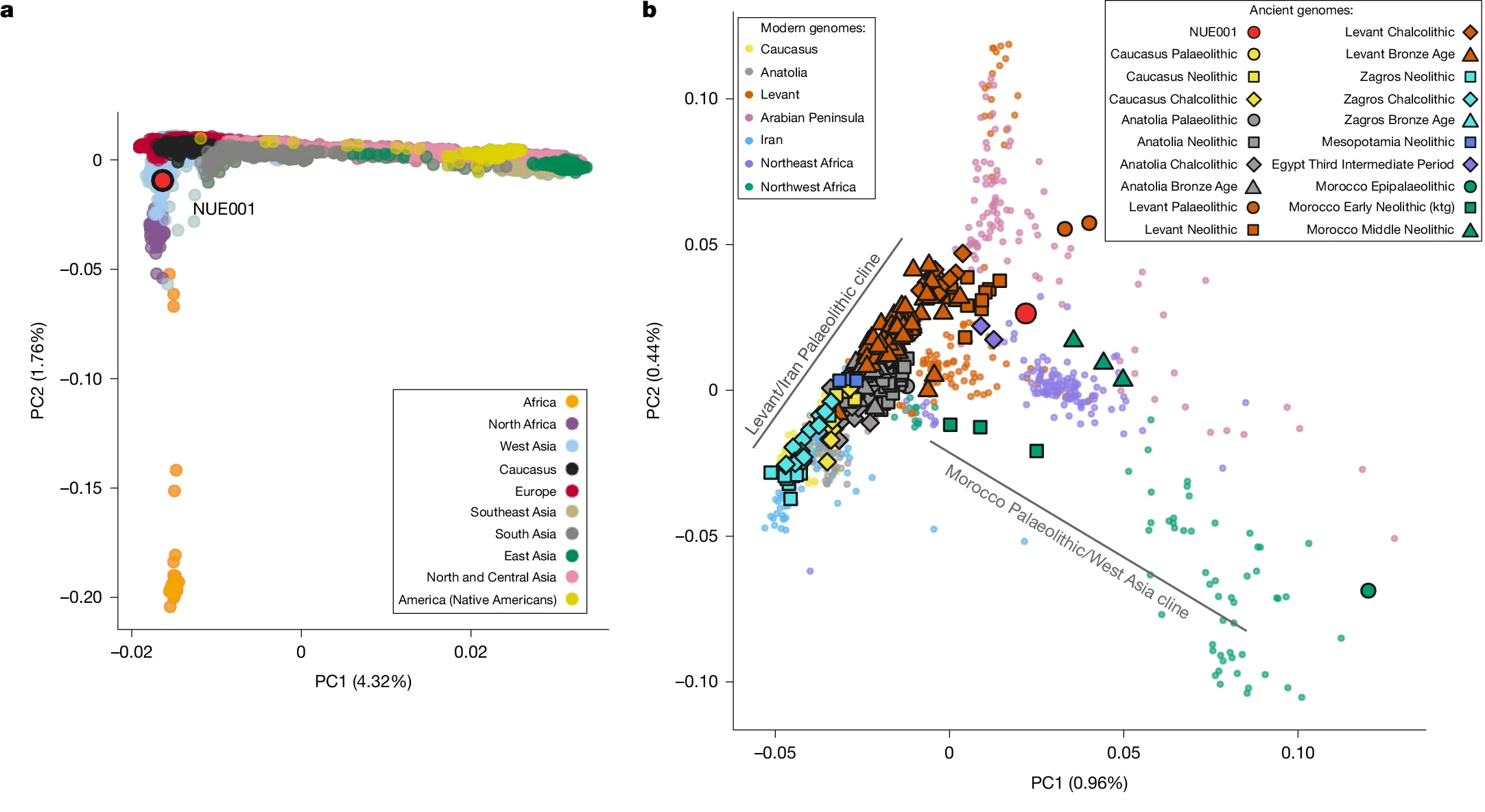
Genetic ancestry of the Nuwayrat genome:a) PCA of present-day worldwide populations, with projection of the Old Kingdom Egyptian genome from Nuwayrat (NUE001). b) PCA of present-day populations from North Africa and West Asia, with projection of ancient North African and West Asian genomes

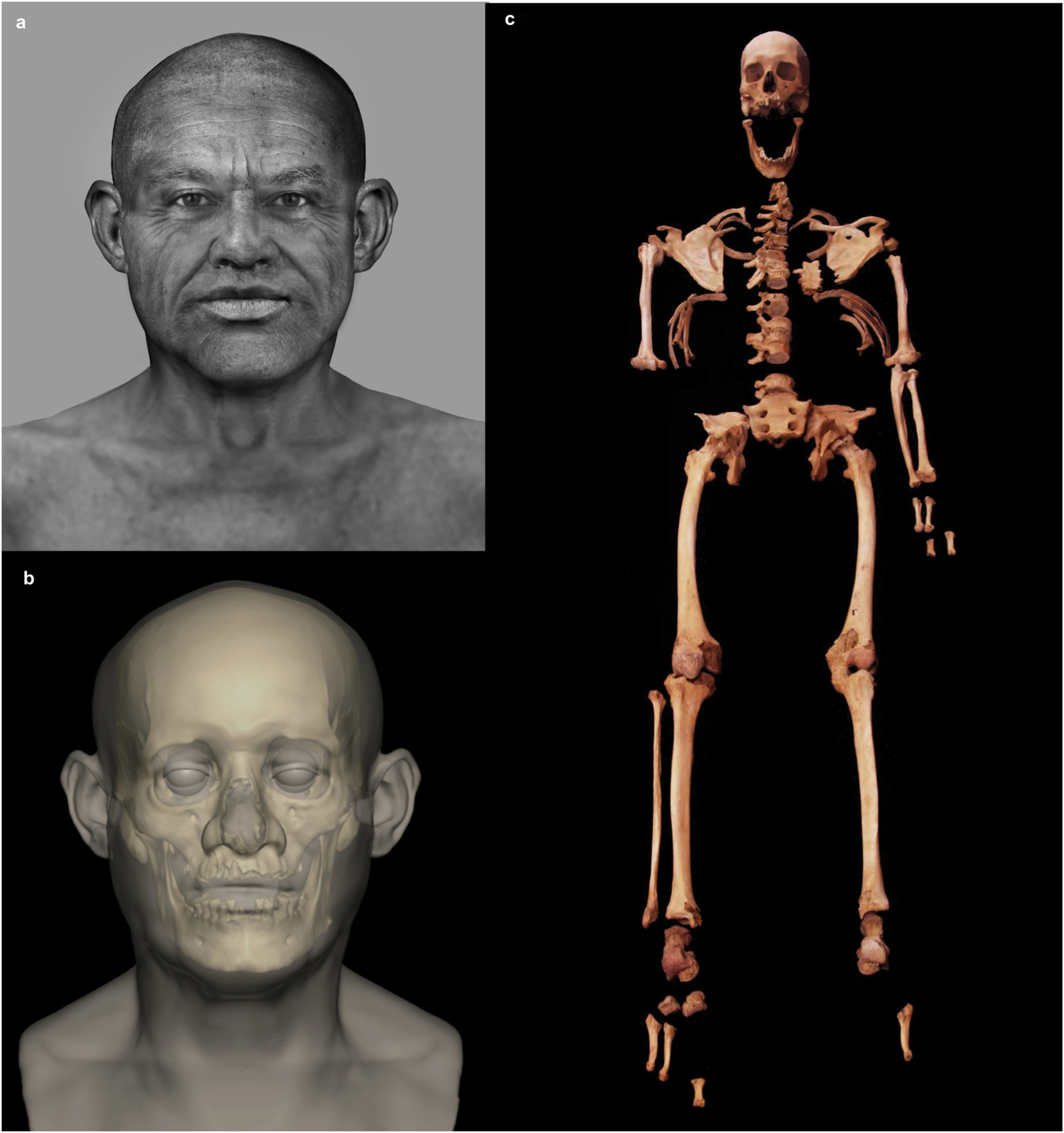
Facial reconstruction and depiction created from the Nuwayrat individual skull.

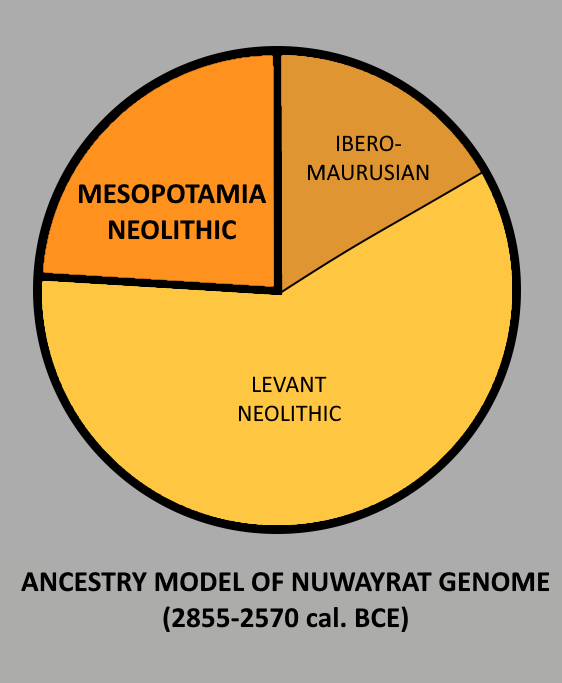
Ancestry model of Nuwayrat genome.

Researchers successfully sequenced the first complete genome of an Old Kingdom individual from Nuwayrat, a high-status male who lived c. 4,500-4,800 years ago (radiocarbon dated to 2855-2570 BCE, confirmed by funerary practices archaeologically attributed to the Third and Fourth Dynasty).

The Nuwayrat individual's genetic profile is best modelled as an admixture between two sources, the majority of which (77.6% ± 3.8%) derives from a population represented by Middle Neolithic individuals from Skhirat-Rouazi in Morocco (4780–4230 BCE), whose own ancestry originates among populations of the Neolithic Levant (76.4 ± 4.0%), with a smaller Iberomaurusian component (22.4 ± 3.8%). The remaining (22.4% ± 3.8%) of the Nuwayrat individual's ancestry is most closely related to Neolithic Mesopotamian genomes (9000–8000 BCE). No other two-source model achieved statistical significance (P > 0.05). Two alternative three-source models were also identified, but these yielded similar ancestry proportions, with only a small additional contribution from the Neolithic/Chalcolithic Levant.

The Nuwayrat individual was genetically most similar to present-day populations of North Africa and West Asia. The mitochondrial DNA haplogroup I/N1a1b2 and chromosome Y haplogroup E1b1b1b2b of the Nuwayrat individual are both most frequently found in these regions, consistent with his whole-genome affinities. Analyses excluded any substantial ancestry in the Nuwayrat genome related to a previously published 4,500-year-old hunter-gatherer genome from the Mota cave in Ethiopia, or other individuals in central, eastern, or southern Africa.

The Nuwayrat individual is predicted to have had brown eyes, brown hair, and skin pigmentation ranging from dark to black. The further osteological examination revealed that he would have stood 157.4–160.5 cm tall. These physical features are broadly consistent with those observed among present-day Egyptians and North Africans.

The authors acknowledged limitations of the study, such as their reliance on a single Egyptian genome for analysis, and known limitations in predicting the above-referenced phenotypic traits in understudied populations. For reference, the HIrisPlex-S phenotype analysis done in the study established probabilities for eye, hair and skin colours as follows: for the eyes, ~98.79% for brown, ~1.19% for intermediate and ~0.02% for blue; for the hair, ~52.89% for black, ~0.14% for red, ~45.04% for brown and ~1.92% for blond; for the skin, ~37.84% for dark to black, ~56.78% for dark, ~5.28% for intermediate and ~0.1% for pale.

Regarding the supplement facial reconstruction, the researchers noted that while the DNA analysis is indicative of population origin, there was no physical evidence of any particular skin colour, eye colour, or hair colour, and therefore, the reconstruction was produced in black and white without head hair or facial hair.

The findings suggest a pattern of wide cultural and demographic expansion from the Mesopotamian region, which affected both Anatolia and Egypt during this period, and shows direct evidence of genetic ancestry related to the eastern Fertile Crescent (specifically Mesopotamian Neolithic) in early dynastic ancient Egypt.

==== Later genetic evolutions ====
Genetic modelling suggests that most present-day Egyptians derive their ancestry from a combination of five ancient populations. Up to 75% traces back to groups related to the Old Kingdom individual from Nuwayrat and to Middle Neolithic populations from Morocco, which contributed approximately 80% of the Nuwayrat individual's ancestry. Additional components include ancestry related to the Bronze Age Levant, which the researchers noted was the second most common ancestry component, as well as more recent admixture from sub-Saharan Africa (East and West African ancestries) that the authors noted was suggested from previous published analysis and their models.

== Genetic studies on modern Egyptians ==
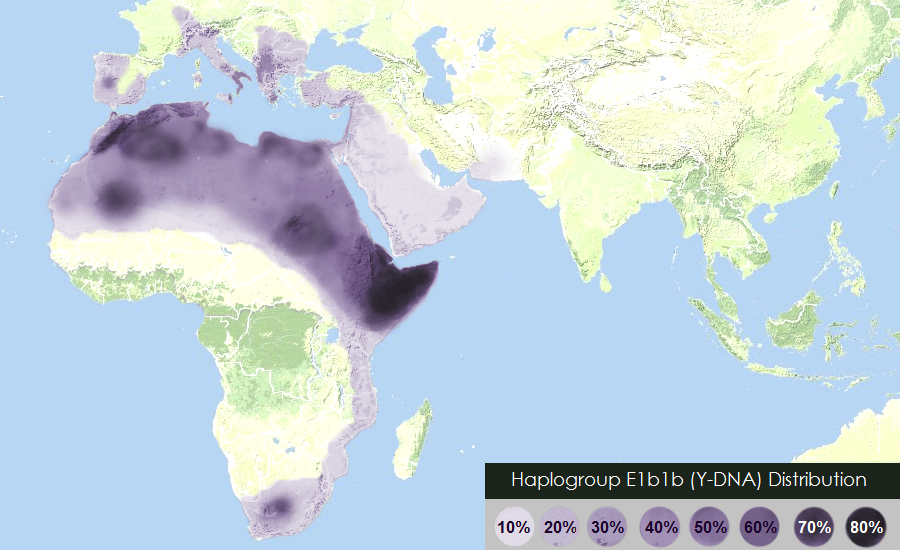
E1b1b is the most common paternal haplogroup across Africa, including Egypt, with modern genetic studies rooting the origin of the E haplogroup in East Africa.

Historically, genetic studies on modern Egyptians have identified very old African lineages along with evidence for the later assimilation of Near Eastern and European groups through an examination of the Y chromosome and mitochondrial DNA chromosome.

Genetic analysis of modern Egyptians reveals that they have paternal lineages common to other indigenous Afroasiatic speaking populations in North Africa, West Asia, Anatolia and Horn of Africa; Some studies have proposed the view that these lineages would have spread into North Africa and Horn of Africa from Western Asia during the Neolithic Revolution and were maintained by the predynastic period.

A study by Krings et al. (1999) on mitochondrial DNA clines along the Nile Valley found that a Eurasian cline runs from Northern Egypt to Southern Sudan and a Sub-Saharan cline from Southern Sudan to Northern Egypt, derived from a sample size of 224 individuals (68 Egyptians, 80 Nubians, 76 southern Sudanese). The study also found Egypt and Nubia have low and similar amounts of divergence for both mtDNA types, which is consistent with historical evidence for long-term interactions between Egypt and Nubia. However, there are significant differences between the composition of the mtDNA gene pool of the Egyptian samples and that of the Nubians and Southern Sudanese samples. The diversity of the Eurasian mtDNA type was highest in Egypt and lowest in southern Sudan, whereas the diversity of the sub-Saharan mtDNA type was lowest in Egypt and highest in southern Sudan. The authors suggested in their conclusion that Egypt and Nubia had more genetic contact than either did with southern Sudan and that the migration from north to south was either earlier or lesser in the extent of gene flow than the migration from south to north.

A study by Luis et al. (2004) found that the male haplogroups in a sample of 147 Egyptians were E1b1b (36.1%, predominantly E-M78), J (32.0%), G (8.8%), T (8.2%), and R (7.5%). The study found that "Egypt's NRY frequency distributions appear to be much more similar to those of the Middle East than to any sub-Saharan African population, suggesting a much larger Eurasian genetic component ... The cumulative frequency of typical sub-Saharan lineages (A, B, E1b1a) is 3.4% in Egypt ... whereas the haplogroups of Eurasian origin (Groups C, D, and F–Q) account for 59% [in Egypt]." E1b1b subclades are characteristic of some Afro-Asiatic speakers and are believed to have originated in either the Middle East, North Africa, or the Horn of Africa. Cruciani et al. (2007) suggests that E-M78, E1b1b predominant subclade in Egypt, originated in Northeastern Africa (Egypt and Libya in the study), with a corridor for bidirectional migrations between northeastern and eastern Africa (at least 2 episodes between 23.9 and 17.3 ky and 18.0–5.9 ky ago), trans-Mediterranean migrations directly from northern Africa to Europe (mainly in the last 13.0 ky), and flow from northeastern Africa to western Asia between 20.0 and 6.8 ky ago. Cruciani et al. proposed that E-M35, the parent clade of E-M78, originated in Eastern Africa during the Palaeolithic and subsequently spread to Northeastern Africa, 23.9–17.3 ky ago. Cruciani et al. also state that the presence of E-M78 chromosomes in Eastern Africa can be only explained through a back migration of chromosomes that had acquired the M78 mutation in Northeast Africa.

Other studies have shown that modern Egyptians have genetic affinities primarily with populations of North Africa and the Middle East, and to a lesser extent the Horn of Africa and European populations. Another study states that "the information available on individual groups in Ethiopia and North Africa is fairly limited but sufficient to show that they are all separate from sub-Saharan Africans and that North Africans and East Africans (such as Ethiopians) are clearly separate", and concluded that most Ethiopians came from an admixture and that the larger fraction of Sub-Saharan genes came during the Neolithic times "before the beginning of the Egyptian civilisation". The study also found the gene frequency of North African populations and, to a lesser extent, East Africa to be intermediate between Africa and Europe. In addition, some studies suggest ties with populations in the Middle East, as well as some groups in southern Europe, and a closer link to other North Africans.

A 2004 mtDNA study of 58 upper Egyptian individuals included 34 individuals from Gurna, a small settlement on the hills opposite Luxor. The 34 individuals from Gurna exhibited the haplogroups: M1 (6/34 individuals, 17.6%), H (5/34 individuals, 14.7%), L1a (4/34 individuals, 11.8%) and U (3/34 individuals, 8.8%). The M1 haplotype frequency in Gurna individuals (6/34 individuals, 17.6%) is similar to that seen in Ethiopian population (20%), along with a West Eurasian component different in haplogroup distribution in the Gurna individuals. However, the M1 haplotypes from Gurna individuals exhibited a mutation that is not present in Ethiopian population; whereas this mutation was present in non-M1 haplotype individuals from Gurna. Nile Valley Egyptians do not show the characteristics that were shown by the Gurna individuals. The results of the study suggested that the sample of Gurna individuals had retained elements of an ancestral genetic structure from an ancestral East African population, characterised by a high M1 haplogroup frequency. Another 2004 mtDNA study featured the Gurna individuals samples, and clustered them together with the Ethiopian and Yemeni groups, in between the Near Eastern and other African sample groups.

A 2005 study found that populations in Somalia, Sudan, Egypt and Oromos in Ethiopia shared the same Y chromosome haplogroup E3b1, defined by E-M78.

A 2005 genetic study found close affinities of eastern sub-Saharan populations with Egypt in the phylogenetic trees through analysis of the short DNA sequences. The authors suggested that the influential role of the Nile River served as a migratory route and an agent of genetic flow which contributed to present-day heterogeneity in Egypt.

Though there has been much debate of the origins of haplogroup M1 a 2007 study had concluded that M1 has West Asia origins not a Sub Saharan African origin, although the majority of the M1a lineages found outside and inside Africa had a more recent East African origin, as a result of "the first M1 backflow [from Asia] to Africa, dated around 30,000 [years ago]". The study states that "the most ancient dispersals of M1 occurred in northwestern Africa, reaching also the Iberian Peninsula, instead of Ethiopia", and states that the evidence points to either "that the Near East was the most probable origin of the primitive M1 dispersals, West into Africa and East to Central Asia ... [with] the Sinai Peninsula as the most probable gate of entrance of this backflow to Africa" or "that M1 is an autochthonous North African clad that had its earliest spread in northwestern areas marginally reaching the Near East and beyond".

However, other authors have proposed the view that the M haplogroup developed in Africa before the 'Out of Africa' event around 50,000 years ago, and dispersed from North Africa or East Africa 10,000 to 20,000 years ago. Quintana-Murci et al. stated in reference to the M haplogroup that "Its variation and geographical distribution suggest that Asian haplogroup M separated from eastern-African haplogroup M more than 50,000 years ago. Two other variants (489C and 10873C) also support a single origin of haplogroup M in Africa".

A 2003 Y-chromosome study was performed by Lucotte on modern Egyptians, with haplotypes V, XI, and IV being most common. Haplotype V is common among all North Africans and has a low frequency outside the North African region. Haplotypes V, XI, and IV are all predominantly North African/Horn of African/Sub-Saharan African (related to Bantu expansion) haplotypes, respectively, and they are far more dominant in Egyptians than in Middle Eastern or European groups. The pattern of diversity for these variants in the Egyptian Nile Valley was largely the product of population events that occurred in the late Pleistocene to mid-Holocene through the First Dynasty.

Keita (2008) examined a published Y-chromosome dataset on Afro-Asiatic populations and remarked that a key subclade of E-M35, namely the key lineage E-M78, was shared between the populations in the locale of original Egyptian speakers and modern Cushitic speakers from the Horn of Africa. These lineages are present in modern Egyptians, Berbers, Cushitic speakers from the Horn of Africa, and Semitic speakers in the Near-East. He noted that variants are also found in the Aegean and Balkans. The origin of E-M35 was in East Africa, whereas the origin of its subclade mutation E-M78 was in Northeast Africa (the area of Egypt and Libya). This parent clade and its subclade mutations in general were dominant in a core portion of Afro-Asiatic speaking populations which included Cushitic, Egyptian, Berber groups, and Semitic speakers from the Near East, where Semitic speakers showed a decline in frequency going west to east in the Levantine-Syria region. He concluded that "the genetic data give population profiles that clearly indicate males of African origin, as opposed to being of Asian or European descent" but acknowledged that the biodiversity does not indicate any specific set of skin colours or facial features as populations were subject to microevolutionary pressures.

In 2010, Crubézy performed a study on the modern populations of Adaïma in Upper Egypt which found that 74% of Copts from Adaïma carried the paternal E1b1 haplogroup, which is widespread in Ethiopia, and 3% of Muslims from Adaïma carried the maternal (mtDNA) haplogroup L0f, a haplogroup which is usually only found in Khoisan people. Crubézy suggested that the presence of E1b1 among Adaïma Copts was due to gene from Ethiopian Christians within the 1st millennium AD. He also suggested that mtDNA L0f found in Adaïma Muslims could be a vestige of an ancient 'proto-Khoisan' population, which contributed genetically to the formation of the predynastic population in Upper Egypt. According to Crubezy this was supported by the finding of an 'important frequency of so-called "Bushman" upper canine' teeth in skeletons from a predynastic-era cemetery at Adaïma. According to a review by the biochemist Jean-Philippe Gourdine published in 2025, Crubézy's DNA findings "confirmed the presence of ancient DNA related to current sub-Saharan populations" at Adaïma, however Gourdine mistakenly thought that DNA was recovered from ancient predynastic skeletons, whereas in fact no ancient DNA was recovered from ancient or predynastic skeletons at Adaïma. Goudine actually stated that E1b1 is the most paternal marker found in Africa, citing Trombetta's 2011 genetic study, and L0f is commonly found in modern Khoi-San populations of South Africa and Tanzania. In another chapter from the same publication S.O.Y Keita argued that the paternal haplogroup E1b1 found in modern Adaïma Copts originated in 'eastern tropical Africa'. Keita based this judgement on a number of genetic studies, specifically stating that "Haplogroup E is defined by the M96 SNP (and others), for which a cautious reading of all of the evidence would indicate an eastern tropical African origin (Cruciani, 2007; Gomes et al., 2010; Trombetta et al., 2015). E, meaning M96, may be around 50,000 years old, but such dates are only approximations. However, it postdates the migration out of Africa. The history of the E haplogroup is also primarily African, although there were migrants to Europe and Asia at different times (Cruciani, 2007)" and its haplogroup had wide distribution from the Horn of Africa up to Egypt .

Babiker, H et al. (2011) examined the genotypes of 15 STRs for 498 individuals from 18 Sudanese populations and featured comparative genotype data with Egypt, Somalia and the Karamoja population from Uganda. Overall, the results showed that the genotypes of individuals from northern Sudan clustered with those of Egypt, the Somali population was found to be genetically distinct and individuals from southern Sudan clustered with those from the Karamoja population. The study determined that similarity of the Nubian and Egyptian populations suggested that migration, potentially bidirectional, occurred along the Nile river Valley, which is consistent with the historical evidence for long-term interactions between Egypt and Nubia.

An allele frequency comparative study led by the Egyptian Army Major General Doctor Tarek Taha conducted STR analysis in 2020 between the two main Egyptian ethnic groups, Muslims and Christians, each group represented by a sample of 100 unrelated healthy individuals, supported the conclusion that Egyptian Muslims and Egyptian Christians genetically originate from the same ancestors.

A Nov 2023 study by Hammarén et al isolated the non-african parts of the genomes of modern day northeast Africans found that Sudanese Copts and Egyptian muslims from Cairo bore most similarities to Levantines, unlike other populations in the region which had predominant genetic contributions from the Arabian peninsula rather than Levant for their Non-African genetic component. The study also found that Egyptian muslims and Sudanese Copts are genetically most similar to Middle Eastern groups rather than the other African populations, they estimated the admixture date for modern Egyptians with Eurasians to have occurred around the 14th century, however the authors noted that "most, if not all, of the populations in this study have or have had admixture with populations from the Middle East during the Arab expansion, and this newer admixture is obscuring older admixture patterns". The study overall points that the distribution of Eurasian ancestry in modern Eastern and Northeast Africa is the result of more recent migrations, many of which are recorded in historical texts rather than ancient one.

=== Y-DNA haplogroups ===
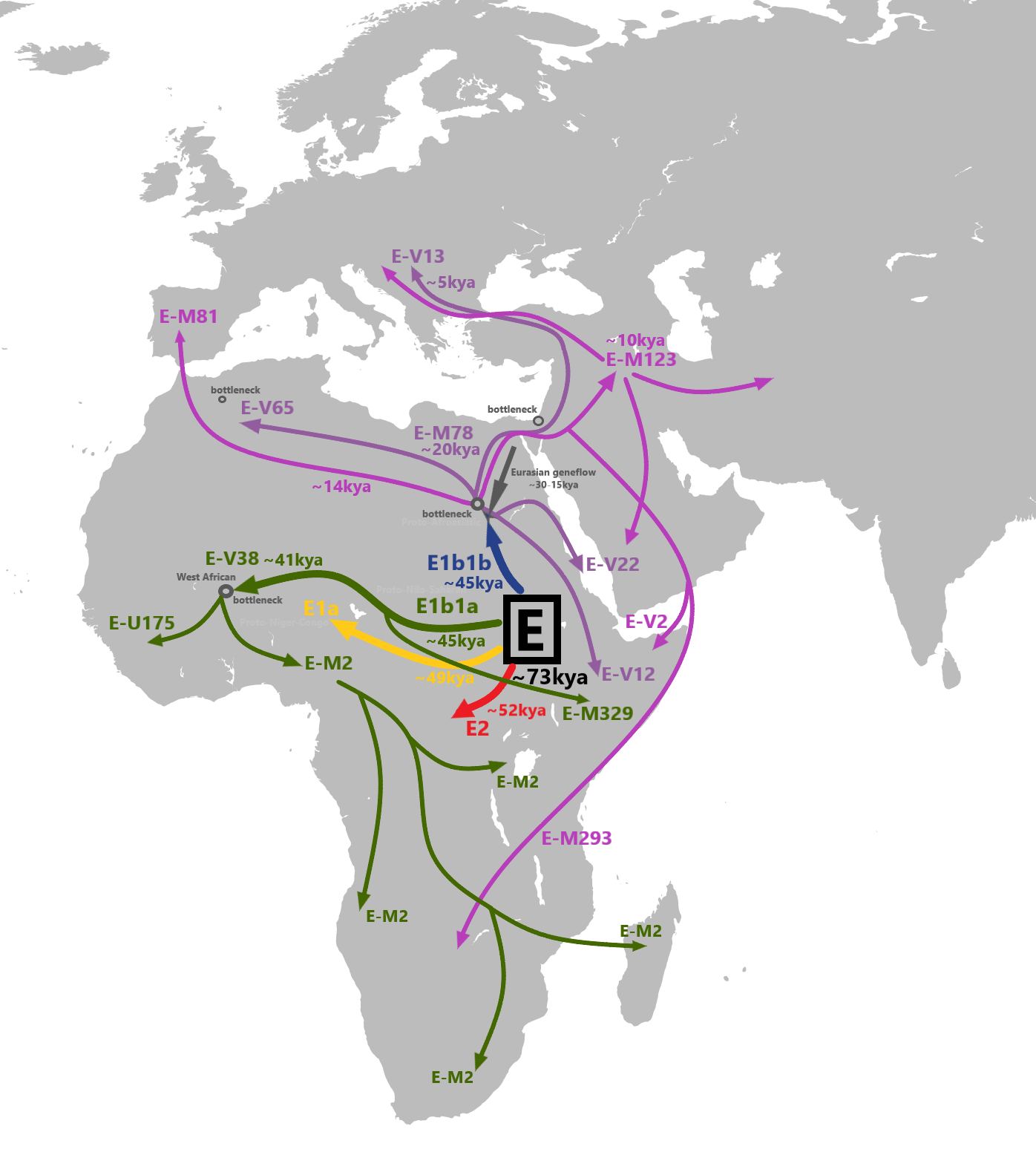
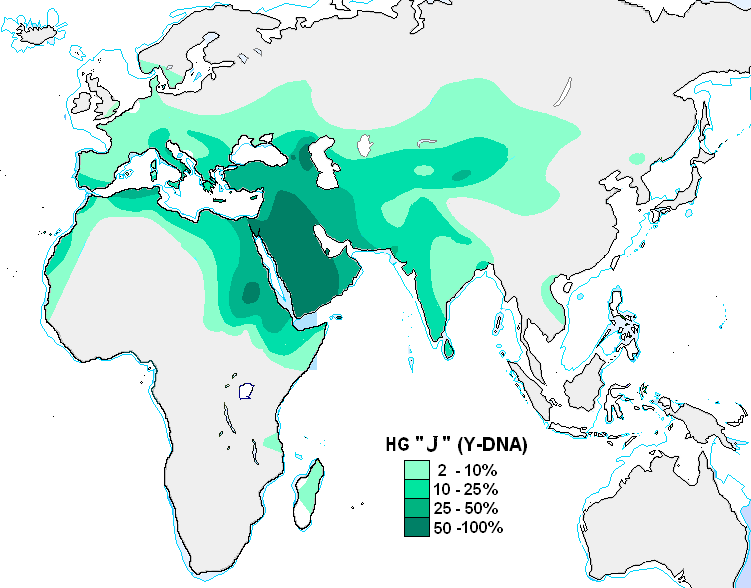
Two haplogroups, E1b1b and J, that are carried by both ancient and modern Egyptians. The subclade E-M78 of E1b1b is suggested to have originated in Northeast Africa in the area of Egypt and Libya, and is more predominant in Egypt. These two haplogroups and their various subclades in general are distributed in high frequencies in the Middle East and North Africa.

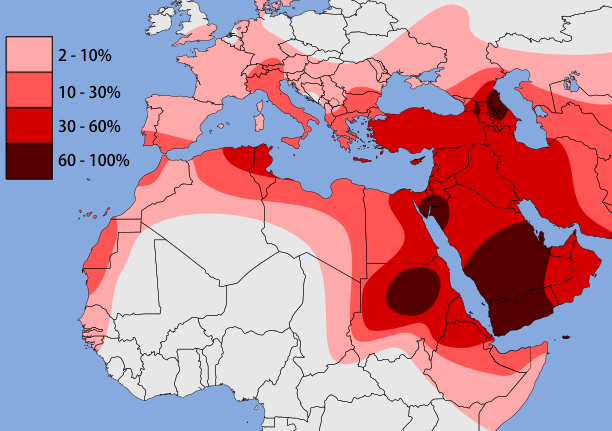
Haplogroup J (Y-DNA) Map on Egypt and the surrounding region. Connecting to the Middle East and Northern Medditeranean.

A study by Arredi et al., which analysed 275 samples from five populations in Algeria, Tunisia, and Egypt, as well as published data from Moroccan populations, suggested that the North African pattern of Y-chromosomal variation, including in Egypt, is largely of Neolithic origin. The study analysed North African populations, including North Egyptians and South Egyptians, as well as samples from southern Europe, the Middle East, and sub-Saharan Africa, and revealed the following conclusions about the male-lineage variation in North Africa: "The lineages that are most prevalent in North Africa are distinct from those in the regions to the immediate north and south: Europe and sub-Saharan Africa ... two haplogroups predominate within North Africa, together making up almost two-thirds of the male lineages: E3b2 and J* (42% and 20%, respectively). E3b2 is rare outside North Africa, and is otherwise known only from Mali, Niger, and Sudan to the immediate south, and the Near East and Southern Europe at very low frequencies. Haplogroup J reaches its highest frequencies in the Middle East".

A study by Lucotte using the Y-chromosome of 274 male individuals (162 from Lower Egypt, 66 from Upper Egypt, 46 from Lower Nubia) found that the main haplotype V has higher frequency in the North than in the South, and haplotype XI has higher frequency in the South than in the North, whereas haplotype IV is found in the South (highest in Lower Nubia). The study states that haplotype IV is also characteristic of Sub-Saharan populations. Remarking on Lucotte's Y-chromosome study, which found that haplotypes V, XI, and IV are most common, Keita states that "a synthesis of evidence from archaeology, historical linguistics, texts, distribution of haplotypes outside Egypt, and some demographic considerations lends greater support to the establishment, before the Middle Kingdom, of the observed distributions of the most prevalent haplotypes V, XI, and IV. It is suggested that the pattern of diversity for these variants in the Egyptian Nile Valley was largely the product of population events that occurred in the late Pleistocene to mid-Holocene through the First Dynasty". Keita later states "Later, mid-Holocene climatic-driven migrations led to a major settlement of the valley in Upper Egypt and Nubia, but less so in Lower Egypt, by diverse Saharans with haplotypes IV, XI, and V. These people fused with the indigenous valley peoples, as did Near Easterners with VII and VIII, but perhaps also some V".

In 2005, based on review of Lucotte's and other published studies dealing with the contemporary Y-Chromosome variation in Egypt, Keita stated haplotype V, should be more appropriately called "Horn-supra-saharan African" and is indigenous to Africa, with the haplotypes V, XI and IV all associated with the M35/215 subclade. Keita and Boyce concluded: "There was no wholesale population replacement. This is not especially surprising because there is no evidence that the earliest Arabic-speakers, who came as teachers of Islam, intended to replace the indigenous populations biologically." They further elaborated that "The peoples of the Egyptian and northern Sudanese Nile valley, and supra-Saharan Africa now speak Arabic in the main, but as noted, this largely represents language shift. Ancient Egyptian is Afroasiatic, and current inhabitants of the Nile Valley should be understood as being in the main, although not wholly, descendants of the pre-Neolithic regional inhabitants, although this apparently varies by geography, as indicated by the frequency of Near Eastern haplotypes/lineages."

The major downstream mutations within the M35 subclade are M78 and M81. There are also other M35 lineages, e.g., M123. In Egypt, haplotypes VII and VIII are associated with the J haplogroup, which is predominant in the Near East.

Population	Nb	A/B	E1b1a	E1b1b1 (M35)	E1b1b1a (M78)	E1b1b1b1 (M81)	E1b1b1b2 (M123, M34)	F	K	G	I	J1	J2	R1a	R1b	Other	Study
Egyptians	110	0	3.5%	0	36%	0	8.5%	0	0	7.5%	0	24.5%	2%	2.8%	8.4%	6.5%	Fadhloui-Zid et al. (2013)
Egyptians	370	1.35%	2.43%	3.24%	21.89%	11.89%	6.76%	1.08%	0.27%	5.68%	0.54%	20.81%	6.75%	2.16%	5.94%	9.21%	Bekada et al. (2013)
Egyptians	147	2.7%	2.7%	0	18.4%	5.4%	0	0	8.2%	8.8%	0	19.7%	12.2%	3.4%	4.1%	2.1%	Luis et al. (2004)
Egyptians from El-Hayez Oasis (Western Desert)	35	0	5.70%	5.7%	28.6%	28.6%	0	0	0	0	0	31.4%	0	0	0	0	Kujanová et al. (2009)
Berbers from Siwa Oasis (Western Desert)	93	28.0%	6.5%	2.2%	6.5%	1%	0	0	0	3.2%	0	7.5%	6.5%	0	28.0%	8.3%	Dugoujon et al. (2009)
Egyptians	87	1%	3%	10%	31%	0	2.5%	0	0	2%	0	20%	15%	5%	2%	8.5%	Pagani et al. (2015)
Northern Egyptians	44	2.3%	0	4.5%	27.3%	11.3%	0	6.8%	2.3%	0	0	9.1%	9.1%	2.3%	9.9%	6.8%	Arredi et al. (2004)
Southern Egyptians	29	0.0%	0	0	17.2%	6.8%	0	17.2%	10.3%	0	3.4%	20.7%	3.4%	0	13.8%	0	Arredi et al. (2004)

Distribution of E1b1b1a (E-M78) and its subclades

Population	N	E-M78	E-M78*	E-V12*	E-V13	E-V22	E-V32	E-V65	Study
Egyptians (sample includes people labelled as "berber" and people from the oases)	370	21.89%	0.81%	7.03%	0.81%	9.19%	1.62%	2.43%	Bekada et al. (2013)
Southern Egyptians	79	50.6%		44.3%	1.3%	3.8%		1.3%	Cruciani et al. (2007)
Egyptians from Bahari	41	41.4%		14.6%	2.4%	21.9%		2.4%	Cruciani et al. (2007)
Northern Egyptians (Delta)	72	23.6%		5.6%	1.4%	13.9%	2.8%		Cruciani et al. (2007)
Egyptians from Gurna Oasis	34	17.6%	5.9%	8.8%			2.9%		Cruciani et al. (2007)
Egyptian from Siwa Oasis	93	6.4%		2.1%				4.3%	Cruciani et al. (2007)

=== Mitochondrial DNA ===
In 2009 mitochondrial data was sequenced for 277 unrelated Egyptian individuals by Jessica L Saunier et al. in the journal Forensic Science International, as follows

- R0 and its subgroups (31.4%)
- L3 (12.3%); and Asian origin (n = 33)

including M (6.9%)

- T (9.4%)
- U (9.0%)
- J (7.6%)
- N (5.1%)
- K (4.7%)
- L2 (3.6%)
- L1 (2.5%)
- I (3.2%)
- W (0.7%)
- X (1.4%); African origin (n = 57) including L0 (2.2%)

=== Autosomal DNA ===
Mohamed, T et al. (2009) in their study of nomadic Bedouins featured a comparative study with a worldwide population database and a sample size of 153 Bedouin males. Their analysis discovered that both Muslim Egyptians and Coptic Christians showed a distinct North African cluster at 65%. This is their predominant ancestral component, and unique to the geographic region of Egypt.

In a 2019 study that analysed the autosomal make-up of 21 modern North African genomes and other populations using Ancient DNA reference populations, this sample of Egyptian genomes were found to share more affinity with Middle Eastern populations compared to other North Africans. Egyptians carry more of the Caucasus hunter gatherer / Iran Neolithic component compared to other North Africans, more of the Natufian related component and less of the Iberomaurusian related component than other North Africans, and also less of the Steppe / European hunter gatherer component, consistent with Egypt's geographical proximity to southwest Asia.

=== Coptic Christians ===
A Y-DNA sample of Copts from Egypt was analysed in Éric Crubézy et al. 2010. The Y-DNA profile was:

- 74% E1b1
- 7% G
- 3% T
- 1% J1
- 15% ambiguous.

Cruzby further added that "The haplotype E1b1 has a fairly wide distribution across Africa, but never had been described with such frequency in this area". He also noted that Ethiopia was one of the areas in the world where the haplotype was most common. Cruzby suggested that this shared lineage could be attributed to the contacts between Coptic Christian communities in both Egypt and Ethiopia although the overlaps between the religious communities were rare.

In the view of scholars Christopher Ehret, David Schoenbrun, Steven A. Brandt, and SOY Keita, the Nile Valley served as a crossroads which resulted in population interactions over a long period of time. They cite a range of published genetic studies which identified E1b1 affinities with the Copt populations that are common among Afro-Asiatic linguistic families including Ethiopian, Cushitic, Beja, Semitic and Berber populations. These authors referenced a range of genetic studies on the Coptic population which include "(Cruciani et al. 2007; Keita 2008) show for its population: 38.3–60% of M35 and 2–6.9% for M2; M89 12– 58%, and smaller percentages of other haplogroups e.g. B. One Coptic sample from a community that emigrated from Egypt to Sudan had frequencies of 17% of M35, 67% of M89, and 15% of B (Hassan et al. 2008). Another sample of Copts from Adaima in Egypt had >70% of M35, majority M78 (Crubezy 2010)".

==== In Sudan ====
According to Y-DNA analysis by Hassan et al. (2008), 45% of Copts in Sudan (of a sample of 33) carry haplogroup J1. Next most common was E1b1b, the most common haplogroup in North Africa. Both paternal lineages are common among other regional Afroasiatic-speaking populations, such as Beja, Ethiopians, and Sudanese Arabs, as well as non-Afroasiatic-speaking Nubians. E1b1b reaches its highest frequencies among North African and Horn of Africa populations such as Amazighs and Somalis. The next most common haplogroups borne by Copts are R1b (15%), most common in Europe, and the widespread African haplogroup B (15%). According to the study, the presence of haplogroup B may also be consistent with the historical record in which southern Egypt was colonised by Nilotic populations during the early state formation.

Maternally, Hassan (2009) found that the majority of Copts in Sudan (of a sample of 29) carried descendants of the macrohaplogroup N; of these, haplogroup U6 was most frequent (28%), followed by T1 (17%). In addition, Copts carried 14% M1 and 7% L1c.

A 2015 study by Dobon et al. identified an ancestral autosomal component of West Eurasian origin that is common to many modern Afroasiatic-speaking populations in Northeast Africa. Known as the Coptic component, it peaks among Egyptian Copts who settled in Sudan over the past two centuries, they also formed a separated group in PCA, a close outlier to other Egyptians, Afroasiatic-speaking Northeast Africans and Middle East populations. The Coptic component evolved out of a main North African and Middle Eastern ancestral component that is shared by other Egyptians and also found at high frequencies among other Afroasiatic-speaking populations in Northeast Africa (~70%), who carry a Nilo-Saharan element as well. The scientists suggest that this points to a common origin for the general population of Egypt. They also associate the Coptic component with Ancient Egyptian ancestry, without the later Arabic influence that is present among other Egyptians, especially people of the Sinai.

In another 2017 study that genotyped and analysed the same populations including Sudanese Copts and Egyptians, The ADMIXTURE analyses and the PCA displayed the genetic affinity of the Copts to the Egyptian population. Assuming few clusters, the Copts appeared admixed between Near Eastern/European populations and northeastern Sudanese and look similar in their genetic profile to the Egyptians. Assuming greater number of clusters (K≥18), the Copts formed their own separate ancestry component that was shared with Egyptians but can also be found in Arab populations. This behaviour in the admixture analyses is consistent with shared ancestry between Copts and Egyptians and/or additional genetic drift in the Copts. The Egyptians and Copts showed low levels of genetic differentiation (FST = 0.00236), lower levels of genetic diversity and greater levels of RoH compared to other northeast African groups, including Arab and Middle Eastern groups that share ancestry with the Copts and Egyptians. A formal test did not find significant admixture into the Egyptians from other tested groups (X), and the Copts and Egyptians displayed similar levels of European or Middle Eastern ancestry (Copts were estimated to be of 69.54% ± 2.57 European ancestry, and the Egyptians of 70.65% ± 2.47 European ancestry). Taken together, these results point to that the Copts and the Egyptians have a common history linked to smaller population sizes, and that Sudanese Copts have remained relatively isolated since their arrival to Sudan with only low levels of admixture with local northeastern Sudanese groups.

== See also ==
- Ancient Egyptian race controversy
- Demographics of Egypt
- Genetic history of Africa
- Genetic history of North Africa
- Genetic history of the Middle East
- Genetic studies on Arabs
- Population history of Egypt
