= Genetic studies on Arabs =

DNA analysis of Arabian populations

Genetic studies on Arabs refers to the analyses of the genetics of ethnic Arab people in the Middle East and North Africa. Arabs are genetically diverse as a result of their intermarriage and mixing with indigenous people of the pre-Islamic Middle East and North Africa following the Arab and Islamic expansion. Genetic ancestry components related to the Arabian Peninsula display an increasing frequency pattern from west to east over North Africa. A similar frequency pattern exist across northeastern Africa with decreasing genetic affinities to groups of the Arabian Peninsula along the Nile river valley across Sudan and the more they go south. This genetic cline of admixture is dated to the time of Arab migrations to the Maghreb and northeast Africa.

In the Levant, the introduction of Islam to the region and the conversion of the region's population to it caused major rearrangements in populations' relations and affinities through admixture with "culturally similar but geographically remote populations" with whom they enjoyed a shared Islamic culture, Arab culture and Arabic language, which led to "genetic similarities between remarkably distant populations like Jordanians, Moroccans, and Yemenis".

A 2018 study of Arabs found that Peninsular Arabs genetically showed two distinct clusters and that Arabs in general can be genetically stratified into four groups; the first consisting of Maghrebi Arabs (Algerians, Moroccans, Tunisians and Libyans) along with the first Arabian Peninsula cluster, which consists of Saudis, Kuwaitis and Yemenis, the second consisting of Levantine Arabs (Palestinians, Lebanese, Syrians and Jordanians) along with Egyptians and Iraqis, the third compromising Sudanese and Comorians, and the fourth compromising the second Arabian Peninsula cluster consisting of Omanis, Emiratis, and Bahrainis. The study confirmed the high genetic heterogeneity among Arabs, especially those of the Arabian Peninsula.

== Uniparental markers ==
=== Y-chromosome ===
The most dominant Paternal Y haplogroup in Arab countries is the Arabian haplogroup J1 (J-M267) and especially its main clade J1-P58 reaching up to 80% in some countries such as Yemen, Qatar and Sudan, according to latest samples studies. J1-M267 that is not P58 are found in Yemen and Oman. The mutation STR DYS388 equal or above 16 found in J1-p58 was used as genetic profiling in forensics since the 1980s to determine Middle Eastern ancestry.

Below is the general distribution of Y-DNA haplogroups among populations of the Arab world:

Population	Language Family	n	R1b	n	R1a	n	I	n	E1b1b	n	E1b1a	n	J	n	G	n	N	n	T	n	L
Arabs (Algeria)	Afro-Asiatic (Semitic)	35	13.0	35	0.0			32	50			35	35								
Arabs (Algeria – Oran)	Afro-Asiatic (Semitic)	102	10.8	102	1			102	50.9	102	12.8	102	27.4								
Arabs (Bedouin)	Afro-Asiatic (Semitic)	32	0.0	32	9.4	32	6.3	32	18.7			32	65.6							32	0.0
Arabs (Iraq)	Afro-Asiatic (Semitic)		10.8		6.5			218	8.3	218	0.9	156	50.6								
Arabs (Israel & West Bank)	Afro-Asiatic (Semitic)	143	8.4	143	1.4	143	6.3	143	20.3			143	55.2							143	0.0
Arabs (Morocco)	Afro-Asiatic (Semitic)	44	3.8	44	0.0	44	0.0	49	85.5			49	20.4								
Arabs (Oman)	Afro-Asiatic (Semitic)	121	1.7	121	9.1	121	0.0	121	15.7	121	7.4	121	47.9	121	1.7			121	8.3	121	0.8
Arabs (Qatar)	Afro-Asiatic (Semitic)	72	1.4	72	6.9	72	0.0	72	5.6	72	2.8	72	66.7	72	2.8	72	0.0	72	0.0	72	2.8
Arabs (Saudi Arabia)	Afro-Asiatic (Semitic)	157	1.9	157	5.1	157	0.0	157	7.6	157	7.6	157	58.0	157	3.2	157	0.0	157	5.1	157	1.9
Arabs (UAE)	Afro-Asiatic (Semitic)	164	4.3	164	7.3			164	11.6	164	5.5	164	45.1	164	4.3	164	0.0	164	4.9	164	3.0
Arabs (Yemen)	Afro-Asiatic (Semitic)	62	0.0	62	0.0	62	0.0	62	12.9	62	3.2	62	82.3	62	1.6	62	0.0	62	0.0	62	0.0
Arabs (Syria)	Afro-Asiatic (Semitic)	20	15.0	20	10.0	20	5.0	20	10.0			20	53.0	20	0.0	20	0.0	20	0.0	20	0.0
Arabs (Lebanon)	Afro-Asiatic (Semitic)	31	6.4	31	9.7	31	3.2	31	25.8			31	45.2	31	3.2	31	0.0	31	0.0	31	3.2
Arabs (Sudan)	Afro-Asiatic (Semitic)	102	15.7			102	3.9	102	16.7			102	47.1								
Arabs (Tunisia)	Afro-Asiatic (Semitic)	148	6.8	148	0.0	148	0.0	148	49.3	148	1.4	148	35.8			148	0.0	148	0.7	148	0.0
Arabs (Libya)	Afro-Asiatic (Semitic)	63	3	63	1.5	63	1.5	63	52.0	63	0.0	63	24.0	63	8.0			63	5.0	63	1.5
Saharawi (SADR)	Afro-Asiatic (Semitic)							29	79.3	29	3.4	29	17.2								
Egyptians	Afro-Asiatic (Semitic)	92–147	5.4-4.1	92–147	0.0-2.7	92–147	1.1-0.7	92–147	43.5-36.7	92–147	3.3-2.8	92–147	22.8-32.0	92–147	2.2-8.8	92–147	0.0-0.0	92–147	7.6-8.2	92	0.0
Egyptians (North)	Afro-Asiatic (Semitic)	43	9.3	43	2.3	43	0.0	43	53.5			44	18.2	43	7.0			43	2.3	43	0.0
Egyptians (South)	Afro-Asiatic (Semitic)	47	13.8					47	78.7												
Lebanese	Afro-Asiatic (Semitic)	914	8.1	914	2.5	914	4.8	914	16.2	914	0.7	914	46.1	914	6.6	914	0.1	914	4.7	914	5.2

=== mtDNA analysis ===
The maternal ancestral lineages of Arabic countries are diverse. The original and still most prevalent maternal haplogroups of Lower Egypt, the Near East and Yemen are R0a1, M1, and HV1. In Syria, there is a Eurasian maternal gene flow where U5 peaks.

=== HLA antigens ===
Many of the genetic disorders specific to Arabs are located on HLA segment on chromosome 6. These same segment mutations are also markers of Arabs in genealogical and forensic profiling tests and studies.

== Autosomal DNA ==
There are various West-Eurasian autosomal DNA components that characterize the populations of the Arab world, namely: the Arabian, Levantine, Coptic, and Maghrebi components. The Arabian component is the main autosomal element in the Persian Gulf region. It is most closely associated with local Arabic-speaking populations.

- The Arabian component is also found at significant frequencies in parts of the Levant and Northeast Africa. The geographical distribution pattern of this component correlates with the pattern of the Islamic expansion, but its presence in Lebanese Christians, (Note: Haber et al. (2013) does not differentiate between different groups of Christians studied. Earlier research discussed by Haber et al. specified only that "Christian, including the major sects Maronite, Orthodox, and Catholic", Lebanese populations were sampled. For details on these groups, see: Lebanese Greek Orthodox Christians; Lebanese Maronite Christians; and Catholic Church in Lebanon.) Sephardi and Ashkenazi Jews, Cypriots and Armenians might suggest that its spread to the Levant represents an earlier event. A separate study by Iosif Lazarides and colleagues published in the same year, correlated this component with Epipaleolithic Natufians from the Levant. This study produced genome-wide ancient DNA from 44 ancient Near Easterners between ~12,000 and 1,400 BCE, including Natufian hunter–gatherers, and suggested an earlier spread of Natufian ancestry to populations of the Levant and Eastern Mediterranean. Natufians were found to be of exclusive West-Eurasian origin, most closely related to modern Arabs like the Bedouins and Yemenis, followed by Egyptian and Berber peoples. A 2018 re-analysis of Natufian samples, including 279 modern populations as a reference, found that the Natufians were largely of local West-Eurasian origin, but harbored 6.8% Eastern African-related ancestry, specifically an Omotic component, which peaks among the Aari people. It is suggested that this Omotic component may have been introduced into the Levant along with the specific Y-haplogroup sublineage E-M215, also known as "E1b1b", to Western Eurasia.
- The Levantine component is the main autosomal element in the Near East and Caucasus. It peaks among Druze populations in the Levant. The Levantine component diverged from the Arabian component about 15,500-23,700 ypb.
- The Coptic component peaks among Copts in Sudan.
- The Maghrebi component is the main autosomal element in the Maghreb. It peaks among the non-Arabized Berber populations in the region. The modern Northern African (Berber) populations have been described as a mosaic of Northern African (Iberomaurusian), Middle Eastern, European (Early European Farmer), and Sub-Saharan African-related ancestries.

A genetic study published in the "European Journal of Human Genetics" in Nature (2019) showed that Middle Easterners (Arabs) are closely related to Europeans and Northern Africans as well as to Southwest Asians. The "Arab macropopulation" is generally closely related to other "West-Eurasian" populations, such as Iranian peoples.

Moorjani et al. (2011) estimated that some Arabs have inherited 4%–15% sub-Saharan ancestry (approximately 9.3% in Palestinians, 14.5% in Bedouins and 4.4% in Druzes), although the percentages were higher (ranging from 5.6% in Druzes to 15.6% in Bedouins) when reanalyzed with the 'STRUCTURE' statistical model.

The 2013 Genetic study found that Kuwaiti natives can roughly be divided into three groups: the first one is largely of West Asian ancestry, representing Persians with European admixture; the second group is predominantly of city-dwelling Arabian tribe ancestry, and the third group includes most of the tent-dwelling Bedouin surnames and is characterized by the presence of 17% Sub-Saharan African ancestry. Population differentiation FST estimates place the first group near Asian populations, the second one near Negev Bedouin tribes, and the third one near the Mozabite population.

The Arab expansion marked one of the last expansions of West-Eurasian ancestry into Africa, with the earliest scientifically attested West-Eurasian geneflow into Africa being dated back to 23,000 BCE (or already earlier), and may be associated with the spread of the Proto-Afroasiatic from the Middle East.

Hodgson et al. (2014) found a distinct non-African ancestry component among Northeastern Africans (dubbed "Ethio-Somali"), which split from other West-Eurasian ancestries, most closely to the Arabian ancestry component, about 23,000 years ago, and migrated into Africa pre-agricultural (between 12,000 and 22,000 years ago).

This component is suggested to have been present in considerable amounts among the Proto-Afroasiatic-speaking peoples. The authors argue that the Ethio-Somali component and the Maghrebi component descended from a single ancestral lineage, which split from the Arabian lineage and migrated into Africa from the Middle East. In Africa, this West-Eurasian lineage diverged into the Maghrebi component, predominant in Northern Africa, and the Ethio-Somali component, found in significant varying degrees among populations of the Horn of Africa.

In 2021, a study showed no genetic traces of early expansions out-of-Africa in present-day populations in the Near-East, but found Arabians to have elevated Basal Eurasian ancestry that dilutes their Neanderthal ancestry.

== Genetic disorders ==
The Arab world has one of the highest rates of genetic disorders globally; some 906 pathologies are endemic in the Arab states, including thalassaemia, Tourette's syndrome, Wilson's disease, Charcot-Marie-Tooth disease, mitochondrial encephalomyopathies, and Niemann-Pick disease.

=== Databases ===
Several organizations maintain genetic databases for each Arabic country, such as Saudi Human Genome Program (SHGP). Even though the KGP, SHGP, QGP, BGP and EGP are revisiting the genetics and genomics of Arab populations' ancestries, lack of complete coordination between the initiatives is a major limitation on revealing the real disease markers of the Arab population.

The Centre for Arab Genomic Studies (CAGS) is the main organization based in the United Arab Emirates. It initiated a pilot project to construct the Catalogue for Transmission Genetics in Arabs (CTGA) database for genetic disorders in Arab populations. At present, the CTGA database is centrally maintained in Dubai and hosts entries for nearly 1,540 Mendelian disorders and related genes. This number is increasing as researchers are joining the largest Arab scientific effort to define genetic disorders described in the region. The center promotes research studies on these emergent disorders.

Some of the genetic disorders with high frequencies in the Arab world are: hemoglobinopathy, sickle cell anemia, glucose-6-phosphate dehydrogenase deficiency, and fragile X syndrome (FXS). The centre provide information about specific countries, and maintain a list of genomic diseases.

Specific rare autosomal recessive diseases are high in Arabic countries like Bardet Biedl syndrome, Meckel syndrome, congenital chloride diarrhea, severe childhood autosomal recessive muscular dystrophy (SMARMD), lysosomal storage diseases and PKU are high in the Gulf states. Dr Teebi's book provides detailed information and by country. The Middle East respiratory syndrome coronavirus (MERS-CoV) that was first identified in Saudi Arabia in 2012 has infected over 3,000 people, mostly in the Middle East and Europe. Nearly 900 of them – over a quarter — have died. MERS is not yet a pandemic, but could become pervasive in genetic disease patients.

Dr Thurman' guidebook about rare genetic diseases Another book Arabic genetic disorders layman guide Saudi Journal article about genetic diseases in Arabic countries The highest proportion of genetic disorders manifestations are: congenital malformations, followed by endocrine metabolic disorders and then by neuron disorders (such as neuromotor disease) and then by blood, immune disorders and then neoplasms. The Mode of Inheritance is mainly autosomal recessive followed by autosomal dominant.

Some of the diseases are beta-thalassemia mutations, sickle-cell disease, congenital heart-disease, glucose-6-phosphate dehydrogenase deficiency, alpha-thalassemia, molecular characterization, recessive osteoperosis, gluthanione-reducatsafe DEf.

=== Diagnosis of genetic disorders ===
Diagnosis of genetic disorders after birth is done by clinicians, lab tests, and sometimes genetic testing. Genetic testing profiling screening of pregnant women's fetuses for List of disorders included in newborn screening programs using microchip genetic microarry might help detect genetic mutations incompatible with life and determining abortion. Some genetic tests of newborn children might help finding the right treatment. Mothers could test for genetic disorders in the fetus by method of chorionic villus sampling (CVS) or amniocentesis.

=== Genealogy and geography ===
While diabetes is very prevalent among Arabs 10% (up to 20%), responsible Arab genes have not been found yet but Saudi mitochondrial genes were found that caused obesity that predisposed to diabetes.

The diseases have geographical distribution among Arab countries such as greater Syria, the Gulf states, Yemen, Western block (Morocco, Algeria, and Tunisia), because of the restricted marriages to each block or even to one country. Moreover, cousin marriages (consanguinity) and endogamy (marriages restricted to minority sects) exacerbate the problem. Distancing of marriages from distant gene pools might help resolve the problem in Arabic countries. Many of the pronounced genetic deficiencies in Arabs are located on HLA segment on chromosome 6. This same segment mutations are markers of Arabs in Genealogical and forensic profiling tests and studies. Such studies as: Arab population data on the PCR-based loci:HLA HLA polymorphism in Saudi.

Since over 70% of Arab genetic disorders are autosomal-recessive, meaning the defective gene has to be found in both father and mother, and since the gene pool is similar in population males and females alike since autosomal chromosomes are admixture from father and mother, in closed societies marriages from same sect endogamy, or same tribe or even from same country, or even from the same block of countries since it is similar in geographical blocks as shown in the online brochures referenced above.

=== Founder Effect Arabic mutations causing Diseases ===
Preface: The founder effect disease causing mutations where "The founder effect refers to the concept that a given gene appeared (presumably by mutation) in a small ancestral population (i.e., in a founder) and by random chance was transmitted to a large number of that founder's offspring." The founder population could be the common ancestry of Arabs or the forced localizations caused by artificial countries inside the larger group of ancestry, hence causing Arab specific founder effect mutation disease found only in all Arabic countries, and Arabic country specific mutation diseases caused by increasing Homozygosity (the existence of same gene on both chromosomes pairs, hence recessive disease increasing in just few generations). The genetic abnormality will increase incrementally with the decrease of number of isolated populations making tribe specific diseases and new Novel genetic defects.

In recessive diseases, founder populations where underlying levels of genome-wide homozygosity are high due to shared common ancestry, but also for consanguineous populations that will have large genome-wide homozygous regions due to inbreeding. Having a catalog of disease-associated variation in these populations enables rapid, early, and accurate diagnoses that may improve patient outcomes due to informed clinical management and early interventions.

The following are diseases that can happen to genetic mutations that have ancient ancestry founding effect mutations that happened in Arabic Ancestry (not including the many novel new mutations caused by consanguinity and unknown factors in recent times):

- Sickle cell anemia
- Hydroxylaze deficiency
- Ataxia with vitamin E deficiency
- Genetic hetero intestinal malabsorption B12
- Autosomal recessive Hearing loss
- Autosomal recessive deafness
- Alpha and Betha thalassemia
- Carbonic anhidrase deficiency,
- Familial Mediterranean fever,
- Fragile X syndrome,
- Gaucher disease,
- Glucose 6 phosphatase dihedrogenase deficiency,
- Hereditary Hemochromatosis,
- Limbs Girdle Muscular deficiency type c,
- Megalo plastic anemia,
- Parkinson's,
- Phenylketonuria
- Primary hyperocaluria
- Congenital Myasthenia Syndrome
- Criger-Najjar Type I syndrome
- Distal renal tubero acidosis
- Sickle haemoglobin
- G6pd deficiency
- A and B thalassemia
- Defnb1
- Phenylketonuria PAH
- Distal Renal tubular acidosis
- Cystic fibrosis
- Leber congenital

=== Prevention ===
To use genetic counseling especially before and after marriage, avoid consanguinity and marry into a different gene pool that has low rates of consanguinity. Most genetic diseases go unnoticed by the affected or their physicians and are dormant, showing up later in life. Genetic testing might reveal the probable existence or dormancy of a disease or syndrome.

=== Discoveries of new syndromes ===
Teebi type of hypertelorism (1987), Teebi Shaltout syndrome (1989), Al Gazali syndrome (1994), Megarbane syndrome (2001)

There are new Arabic names for emerging genetic disorders and syndromes such as:

Spectrum of Genetic Disorders in Arabs, Lebanese type of mannose 6--phosphate receptor recognition defect (1984), Algerian type of spondylometaphyseal dysplasia (1988), Kuwaiti type of cardioskeletalsyndrome (1990), Yemenite deaf-blind hypopigmentation syndrome (1990), Nablus mask-like facial syndrome (2000), Jerash type of the distal hereditary motor neuropathy (2000), Karak syndrome (2003), Omani type of spondyloepiphy.

== See also ==
- Arab people
- Arab studies
- Arabization
- DNA history of Egypt
- Genetic history of the Middle East
- Genetic history of North Africa
- Genetic studies on Jews
- Genetic studies on Moroccans
