= Genetic history of North Africa =

North African genetic history

The most important source of gene flow to North Africa from the Neolithic Era onwards was from Western Asia, whereas the Sahara Desert to the south and the Mediterranean Sea to the north formed barriers to gene flow from the rest of Africa (sub-Saharan Africa) and parts of Europe in prehistory. North Africa is connected to Western Asia via the Isthmus of Suez and the Sinai Peninsula, while at the Straits of Gibraltar, North Africa and Europe are separated by only 15 km (9 mi), similarly Malta, Sicily, Canary Islands, Lampedusa and Crete are close to the coasts of North Africa, with the indigenous Guanche people of the Canary Islands being North African Berbers.

North Africa is a genetically heterogenous and diverse region, and is characterized by its diverse ethno-linguistic groups, the main ones being Arabic and Berber-speaking people. Although historically and sociologically this consideration is assumed, no genetic differences have been reported between Arabs and Berbers when analyzing individual genetic markers. North African populations show a complex and heterogeneous genetic structure that has been described as an amalgam of at least four different ancestral components from the Middle East in particular, sub-Saharan Africa, Europe and also indigenous North Africans who are genetically distinct from these three. Although North Africa has experienced gene flows from the surrounding regions, it has also experienced long periods of genetic isolation. Some genetic studies have been criticised for their interpretation and categorisation of African genetic data.

Current scientific debate is concerned with determining the relative contributions of different periods of gene flow to the current gene pool of North Africans. Anatomically modern humans are known to have been present in North Africa during the Middle Paleolithic (300,000 years ago), as attested by the by Jebel Irhoud 1. Without morphological discontinuity, the Aterian was succeeded by the Iberomaurusian industry. The Iberomaurusian industry was succeeded by the heavily West Asian influenced Capsian industry (8000 BC to 2700 BC) in the eastern part of North Africa (Egypt, Libya, Tunisia, eastern Algeria and Malta).

DNA studies of Iberomaurusian peoples at Taforalt, Morocco, dating to around 15,000 years ago have found them to have a distinctive Maghrebi ancestry, formed from a mixture of Near Eastern component (related to the Natufian culture) and an ancestral North African component (that diverged from Sub-Saharan Africans around the same time as the out of Africa population), which is widespread among early Holocene North Africans, and is still found as a part of the genome of modern Northwest Africans. Individuals from Takarkori cave in southern Libya, dating to 7,000 years ago, are in contrast primarily of ancestral North African ancestry. There is evidence of a small amount (few %) of gene flow from European western hunter-gatherers into some eastern Maghreb hunter-gatherers during the late Mesolithic-early Neolithic (c. 8000 years ago). Later during the Neolithic, from around 7,500 years ago onwards, there was a migration into Northwest Africa of European Neolithic Farmers from the Iberian Peninsula (who had originated in Anatolia several thousand years prior), as well as pastoralists from the Levant, both of whom also significantly contributed to the ancestry of modern Northwest Africans.

After migrating to North Africa in the 1st millennium BC, Semitic Phoenician settlers from the cities of Tyre, Arvad, Ekron and Sidon in the Levant established over 300 coastal colonies throughout the region (as well as the Iberian Peninsula, Sicily, Malta, Sardinia, Corsica etc.) and built a powerful empire that controlled most of the region from the 8th century BC until the middle of the 2nd century BC.

A 2025 genetic study analyzed the remains of 196 people from 14 archaeological sites linked to the Phoenicians and Punic people, including sites in Sicily and Sardinia. The results suggest that, during the early stages of Phoenician colonization, the expansion of Punic communities was mainly driven by people with Sicilian-Aegean ancestry. In contrast, Phoenicians from the Levant contributed little or no genetic ancestry to Punic settlements in the central and western Mediterranean. North African ancestry became common in the Punic world only after 400 BC. This suggests that the growing power and influence of Carthage helped spread this ancestry to other areas. However, North African ancestry remained a small part of the genetic background of the people studied at all the sites, including Carthage itself.

In the 7th century AD, the region was conquered by Muslim Umayyad Arabs from the Arabian Peninsula. Under the relatively brief Arab-Umayyad conquest and the later arrival of nomadic Bedouin, Levantine Arabs and Arabized peoples from the Near East in Western Asia and the arrival of some Sephardi Jews and Iberian Muslims fleeing the Spanish Catholic Reconquista of Iberia, a partial population mix or fusion may have taken place and have resulted in some further genetic diversity among some North Africans, increasing the significant already long established West Asian input. The trans-Saharan slave trade which began in the 8th century AD has resulted in increased levels of Sub-Saharan African ancestry in North Africans in Medieval and modern times relative to earlier periods.

A recent study from 2017 suggested that the Arab migrations to the Maghreb was mainly a demographic process that heavily implied gene flow and remodeled the genetic structure of the Maghreb, rather than a mere cultural replacement as claimed by older studies. Another study found out that the majority of J-M267 (Eu10) chromosomes in the Maghreb are due to the recent gene flow caused by the Arab migrations to the Maghreb in the first millennium CE as both southern Qahtanite and northern Adnanite Arabs added to the heterogenous Maghrebi ethnic melting pot. The Eu10 chromosome pool in the Maghreb is derived not only from early Neolithic dispersions from Western Asia but to a much greater extent from recent expansions of Arab tribes from the Arabian Peninsula. While acknowledging the genetic impact of Arabization of Northwest Africa during the Islamic period, other authors have suggested that earlier migration processes, such as the arrival of Neolithic Revolution era famers from Western Asia and Southern Europe together with Bronze Age and Iron Age input from Mesopotamia and the Levant were ultimately more genetically impactful.

== Y-chromosome ==
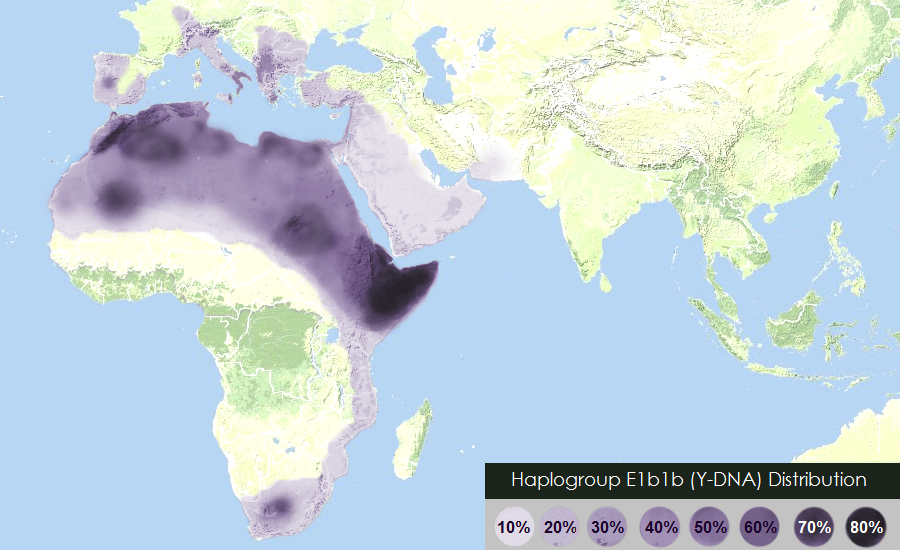
E1b1b is the most common paternal haplogroup across Africa, including Egypt, with modern genetic studies rooting the origin of the E haplogroup in East Africa.

Previous works with Y-chromosome markers have shown that North Africa is highly heterogenous, the Y lineages found in the region are: A, B, E-V38, E-M78, E-M81, E-M123, G, F, H, I1, I2, J1, J2 and R1b. E-M81 reaches an average frequency of 40% across the region. J-M267 is the second most-frequent haplogroup, accounting for around 30% of North Africans and assumed to have spread out of the Arabian Peninsula or Levant into North Africa.

Haplogroup E is thought to have emerged in Africa or Eurasia, and would have originated, or later dispersed into North Africa. Common subclades include E1b1b1a, E1b1b1b and E1b1b1*. E1b1b1b is distributed along a west-to-east cline with frequencies that can reach as high as 80 per cent among Hassani Arabs and 1% among Siwa Berbers. E1b1b1a has been observed at low to moderate frequencies among Berber populations with significantly higher frequencies observed in Northeast Africa relative to Northwest Africa. Loosdrecht et al. 2018 demonstrated that E1b1b is most likely indigenous to Levant and migrated from Levant to North Africa during the Paleolithic.

Haplogroup J-M267 is another very common haplogroup in the Maghreb, being the second most-frequent haplogroup after haplogroup E. Haplogroup R1 has also been observed at moderate frequencies. A thorough study by Arredi et al. (2004), which analyzed populations from Algeria, concludes that the North African pattern of Y-chromosomal variation (including both J1 and E1b1b main haplogroups) is largely of West Asian origin, which suggests that their introduction in this part of the world was to a great extent the result of a migration of recent Semitic pastoralists from the Middle East, although more recent papers have suggested that this date could have been as long as ten thousand years ago during the Neolithic, with the transition from the Oranian to the West Asian originating Capsian culture in North Africa. Another study concluded that the J-M267 chromosome pool in the Maghreb is derived not only from early Neolithic dispersions from Levant, Mesopotamia and Anatolia but to a much greater extent from recent expansions of Arab tribes from the Arabian Peninsula during the Arab migrations to the Maghreb.

Keita (2008) examined a published Y-chromosome dataset on Afro-Asiatic populations and found that a key lineage E-M35/E-M78, sub-clade of haplogroup E, was shared between the populations in the locale of original Egyptian and Libyan speakers and modern Cushitic speakers from the Horn of Africa. These lineages are present in modern Egyptians, Berbers, Cushitic speakers from the Horn of Africa, and Semitic speakers in Western Asia. He noted that variants are also found in the Aegean and Balkans, but the origin of the M35 subclade mutation was in Egypt or Libya, and its clades were dominant in a core portion of Afro-Asiatic speaking populations which included Cushitic, Egyptian and Berber groups, and in Semitic speakers, but showed a decline in frequency among Semites going west to east in the Levantine-Syria-Mesopotamia region. Keita identified high frequencies of M35 (>50%) among Omotic populations, but stated that this only derived from a small, published sample of 12. Keita also wrote that the PN2 mutation was shared by M35 and M2 lineages and he believed this paternal clade originated from prehistoric East Africa. He concluded that "the genetic data give population profiles that clearly indicate males of African origin, as opposed to being of Asian or European descent" but acknowledged that the biodiversity does not indicate any specific set of skin colours, racial types or facial features as populations were subject to microevolutionary pressures.

=== E1b1b1b (Haplogroup E-M81); formerly E3b1b, E3b2 ===
E1b1b1b (E-M81) is the most common Y chromosome haplogroup in North Africa, dominated by its sub-clade E-M183. It might have originated in North Africa. The parent clade, E1b1b, has been found among Prehistoric Levantines, Mesopotamians, Anatolians and North-Africans. This haplogroup has been found at high levels in Medieval Berber people from Al-Andalus and among Canary Islands which were inhabited by Berber Guanche people, with lower but significant amounts also in Portugal, Southern Spain, Southern Italy and the Provence region of France. As a result of European colonization, E-M81 is found in parts of Latin America, among Hispanic in USA. This sub-clade of E1b1b1 has also been observed at 40 per cent in the comarca Pasiegos from Cantabria.

In smaller numbers, E-M81 carrying individuals can be found in Malta, Northern Sudan, Cyprus and among Sephardic Jews.

There are two recognized sub-clades, although one is much more common than the other.

Sub-clades of E1b1b1b (E-M81):

- E1b1b1b1 (E-M107). Underhill et al. (2000) found in one sample from Mali. (Note: The study only explicit mentions the ethnicity of two Malian samples as Tuareg and Bozo with both belonging to the "haplogroup III".)
- E1b1b1b2b (E-M183). Most individuals belong to this subclade.
- E1b1b1b2 (E-M165). Underhill et al. (2000) found in one Middle Eastern sample. (Note: Under the label "Mid-east" without further information.)

The general parent Y-chromosome Haplogroup E1b1b (formerly known as E3b), which might have originated in North Africa, the Horn of Africa or Western Asia, is by far the most common clade in North and Northeast Africa and found in some populations in Europe, particularly in the Mediterranean and South Eastern Europe. E1b1b reaches Greece, Malta and the Balkan region in Europe but is not as high there as it is among North African populations. Outside of North and Northeast Africa, E1b1b's two most prevalent clades are E1b1b1a (E-M78, formerly E3b1a) and E1b1b1b (E-M81, formerly E3b1b).

A study from Semino (published 2004) showed that Y-chromosome haplotype E1b1b1b (E-M81), is specific to North African populations and almost absent in Europe, Western Asia and sub-Saharan Africa, except in the European regions of Iberia (Spain, Portugal, Gibraltar, Andorra) and Sicily. Another 2004 study showed that E1b1b1b is found present, albeit at low levels throughout Southern Europe (ranging from 1.5 per cent in Northern Italians, 2.2 per cent in Central Italians, 1.6 per cent in Southern Spaniards, 3.5 per cent in the French, 4 per cent in the Northern Portuguese, 12.2 per cent in the Southern Portuguese and 41.2 per cent in the genetic isolate of the Pasiegos from Cantabria in Italy).

The findings of this latter study contradict a more thorough analysis Y-chromosome analysis of the Iberian Peninsula according to which haplogroup E1b1b1b surpasses frequencies of 10 per cent in Southern Spain and southern Portugal. The study points only to a very limited influence from Northern Africa and West Asia in Iberia, both in historic and prehistoric times.

A wide-ranging study (published 2007) using 6,501 unrelated Y-chromosome samples from 81 populations found that: "Considering both these E-M78 sub-haplogroups (E-V12, E-V22, E-V65) and the E-M81 haplogroup, the contribution of Northern African lineages to the entire male gene pool of Iberia (barring Pasiegos), continental Italy and Sicily can be estimated as 5.6 percent, 3.6 percent and 6.6 percent, respectively." It has also been argued that the European distribution of E-M78 and its sub-clades is compatible with the Neolithic demic diffusion of agriculture, but also possibly partly from at least, the Mesolithic. For example, Battaglia et al. (2008) estimated that E-M78 (called E1b1b1a1 in that paper) has been in Europe longer than 10,000 years. In support of this theory, human remains excavated in a Spanish funeral cave dating from approximately 7,000 years ago were shown to be in this haplogroup. More recently, two E-M78 have been found in the Neolithic Sopot and Lengyel cultures from the same period in Poland, which seems supported by the most recent studies (including autosomal research).

A very recent study about Sicily by Gaetano et al. 2008 found that "The Hg E3b1b-M81, widely diffused in northwestern African populations, is estimated to contribute to the Sicilian gene pool at a rate of 6 percent."

According to the most recent and thorough study about Iberia by Adams et al. 2008 that analysed 1,140 unrelated Y-chromosome samples in Iberia, a limited contribution of northern African lineages to the entire male gene pool of Iberia was found: "mean North African admixture is just 10.6 percent, with wide geographical variation, ranging from zero in Gascony to 21.7 percent in Northwest Castile".

=== J-M267 (Haplogroup J1) ===
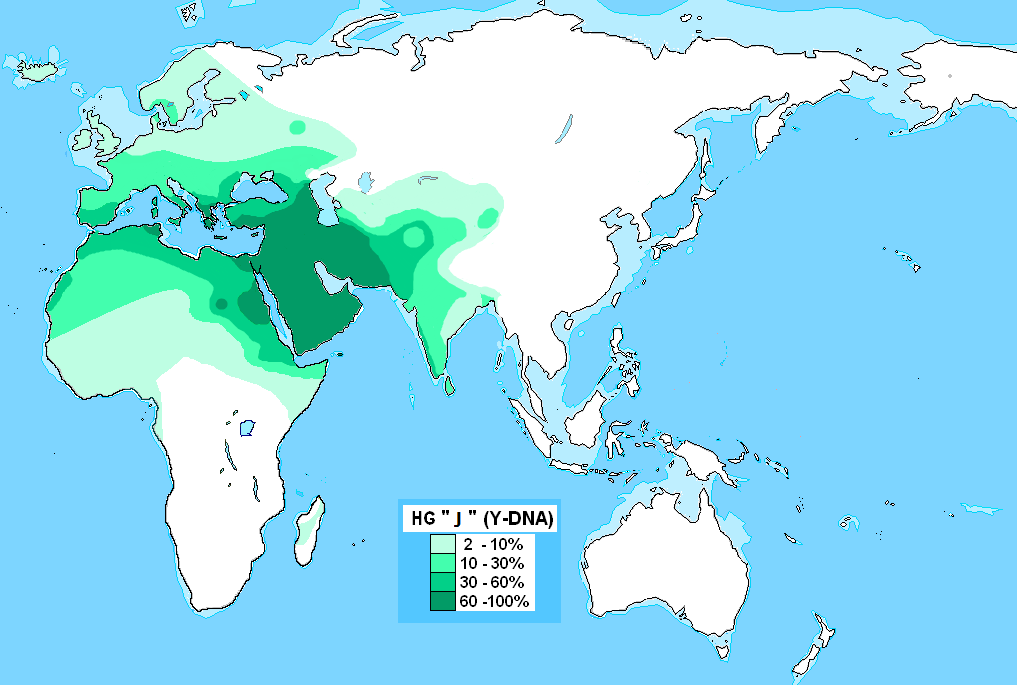
Distribution of Haplogroup J (Y-DNA)

J-M267 (J1) is the second most common Y chromosome haplogroup in North Africa. It originated in the Middle East, and its highest frequency of 30%–62.5% has been observed in Arab, Assyrians, Mandean, Mizrahi and Georgian populations in Western Asia and south Caucasus. A study found out that the majority of J1 (Eu10) chromosomes in the Maghreb are due to the recent gene flow caused by the Arab migrations to the Maghreb in the first millennium CE, although some may be from pre-Arab migrations dating from the Neolithic onwards. The J-M267 chromosome pool in the Maghreb is derived not only from early non-Arab Neolithic dispersions but to a much greater extent from recent expansions of Arab tribes from the Arabian Peninsula, during which both southern Qahtanite and northern Adnanite Arabs added to the heterogenous Maghrebi ethnic melting pot. A study from 2017 suggested that these Arab migrations were a demographic process that heavily implied gene flow and remodeled the genetic structure of the Maghreb, rather than a mere cultural replacement as claimed by older studies.

Recent genome-wide analysis of North Africans found substantial shared ancestry with the Middle East dating back to at least the Neolithic, and to a lesser extent sub-Saharan Africa and Europe. The recent gene flow caused by the Arab migrations to the Maghreb increased these already extant genetic similarities between North Africans and Middle Easterners. Haplogroup J1-M267 accounts for around 30% of North Africans and has spread from the Arabian Peninsula and Levant, second after E1b1b1b which accounts for 45% of North Africans. A study from 2021 has shown that the highest frequency of the Middle Eastern component ever observed in North Africa so far was observed in the Arabs of Wesletia in Tunisia, who had a Middle Eastern component frequency of 71.8%. According to a study from 2004, Haplogroup J1 had a frequency of 35% in Algerians and 34.2% in Tunisians.

== Mitochondrial DNA ==
Individuals receive mtDNA only from their mothers. According to Macaulay et al. 1999, "one-third (33%) of Mozabite Berber mtDNAs have a Near Eastern ancestry, probably having arrived in North Africa less than 50,000 years ago, and one-eighth (12.5%) have an origin in sub-Saharan Africa. Europe appears to be the source of many of the remaining sequences, with the rest having arisen either in Europe or in the Near East". Maca-Meyer et al. 2003 analyze the "autochthonous North African lineage U6" in mtDNA, and conclude that:

The most probable origin of the proto-U6 lineage was the Near East. Around 30,000 years ago it spread to North Africa where it represents a signature of regional continuity. Subgroup U6a reflects the first North African expansion from the Maghreb returning to the east in Paleolithic times. Derivative clade U6a1 signals a posterior movement from Western Asia back to the Maghreb and North Africa. This migration coincides with a possible Afroasiatic linguistic expansion.

A genetic study by Fadhlaoui-Zid et al. 2004 argues concerning certain exclusively North African haplotypes that "expansion of this group of lineages took place around 10,500 years ago in North Africa, and spread to neighbouring population", and apparently that a specific Northwestern African haplotype, U6, probably originated in the Near East 30,000 years ago accounts for 28 per cent in Mozabites, 18 per cent in Kabyles, but only accounts for 6-8 per cent in the southern Moroccan Berbers. Rando et al. 1998 "detected female-mediated gene flow from sub-Saharan Africa to NW Africa" amounting to as much as 21.5 per cent of the mtDNA sequences in a sample of NW African populations; the amount varied from 82 per cent in Tuaregs to less than 3 per cent in Riffians in north of Morocco. This north-south gradient in the sub-Saharan contribution to the gene pool is supported by Esteban et al.

Nevertheless, individual Berber communities display a considerably high mtDNA heterogeneity among them. The Berbers of Jerba Island, located in South Eastern Tunisia, display an 87 per cent West Eurasian contribution with no U6 haplotypes, while the Kesra of Tunisia, for example, display a much higher proportion of typical sub-Saharan mtDNA haplotypes (49 per cent), as compared to the Zriba (8 per cent). According to the article, "The North African patchy mtDNA landscape has no parallel in other regions of the world and increasing the number of sampled populations has not been accompanied by any substantial increase in our understanding of its phylogeography. Available data up to now rely on sampling small, scattered populations, although they are carefully characterized in terms of their ethnic, linguistic, and historical backgrounds. It is therefore doubtful that this picture truly represents the complex historical demography of the region rather than being just the result of the type of samplings performed so far."

A 2005 study discovered a close mitochondrial link between Berbers and the Uralic speaking Saami of northern Scandinavia and the sub-Arctic, and argues that Southwestern Europe and North Africa was the source of late-glacial expansions of hunter-gatherers that repopulated Northern Europe after a retreat south during the Last Glacial Maximum, and reveals a direct maternal link between those European hunter-gatherer populations and the Berbers. With regard to Mozabite Berbers, one-third (33%) of Mozabite Berber mtDNAs have a Near Eastern ancestry, probably having arrived in North Africa ~50,000 years ago, and one-eighth (12.5%) have an origin in sub-Saharan Africa. Europe appears to be the source of many of the remaining sequences, with the rest (54.5%) having arisen either in Europe or in the Near East."

According to the most recent and thorough study on Berber mtDNA from Coudray et al. 2008, which analysed 614 individuals from 10 different regions (Morocco (Asni, Bouhria, Figuig, Souss), Algeria (Mozabites), Tunisia (Chenini-Douiret, Sened, Matmata, Jerba) and Egypt (Siwa)), the results may be summarized as follows:

- Total West Eurasian lineages (H, HV, R0, J, M, T, U, K, N1, N2, X): 80 per cent
- Total African lineages (L0, L1, L2, L3, L4, L5): 20 per cent

The Berber mitochondrial pool is characterized by an overall high frequency of Western Eurasian haplogroups, a markedly lower frequency of sub-Saharan L lineages, and a significant (but differential) presence of North African haplogroups U6 and M1.

There is a degree of dispute about when and how the minority sub-Saharan L haplogroups entered the North African gene pool. Some papers suggest that the distribution of the main L haplogroups in North Africa was mainly due to the Islamic era trans-Saharan slave trade, as espoused by Harich et .al in a study conducted in 2010. However, also in September 2010, a study of Berber mtDNA by Frigi et al. concluded that some of the L haplogroups were much older and introduced by an ancient African gene flow around 20,000 years ago.

Genetic studies on Iberian populations also show that North African mitochondrial DNA sequences (haplogroup U6) and sub-Saharan sequences (Haplogroup L), although present at only low levels, are still at higher levels than those generally observed elsewhere in Europe, though very likely, most of the L mtDNA that has been found in minor amounts in Iberia, is actually pre-neolithic in origin, as it was demonstrated by María Cerezo et al., (Reconstructing ancient mitochondrial DNA links between Africa and Europe) and U6 too, which also have a very old presence in Iberia, since Iberia has a great diversity in lineages from this haplogroup, it was already found in some local hunter-gatherer remains and its local geographic distribution is not compatible, in many cases, with Moor occupation area. Haplogroup U6 have also been detected in Sicily and Southern Italy at much lower frequencies. It happens also to be a characteristic genetic marker of the Saami populations of Northern Scandinavia.

It is difficult to ascertain that U6's presence is the consequence of Islam's expansion into Europe during the Middle Ages, particularly because it is more frequent in the west of the Iberian Peninsula rather than in the east. In smaller numbers it is also attested in the British Isles, again in its northern and western borders. It may be a trace of a prehistoric Neolithic/Megalithic/Mesolithic or even Upper Paleolithic expansion along the Atlantic coasts from North Africa or Iberian Peninsula, perhaps in conjunction with seaborne trade, although an alternative, but less likely explanation, would attribute this distribution in Northern Britain to the Roman period. One subclade of U6 is particularly common among Canarian Spaniards as a result of native Guanche (proto-Berber) ancestry.

It was shown via 733 contemporary and 43 ancient mitochondrial DNA genomes studied from Morocco, Algeria, Tunisia, Libya and Egypt, that the genetic makeup of North Africans can be traced to Eurasia, local North Africa, and sub-Saharan Africa.

David Schoenbrun, Christopher Ehret, Steven A. Brandt and Shomarka Keita (2025) have highlighted the problematic categorisation of genetic haplogroups characterised as ‘African’ and ‘Eurasian' in North African genome studies. In reference to the van de Loosdrecht et al. 2018 study on the epipalaeolithic Taforalt remains from Morocco, which identified the EM35 (primarily EM78) common in north-eastern Africa but characterised the mtDNA (female lineage haplogroups) of U6 and M1 as 'Eurasian', the authors questioned this classification of these maternal haplogroups despite their localised and long-established presence in ancient African populations. In their view, identifying a range of African populations may still remain an issue “since the idea of ‘African’ still gets stereotyped or restricted. (Accepting the southwestern Asian/Levantine geographical continuity with Africa eliminates a conceptual barrier related to racio-typological thinking permitting an Africasian construct analogous to Eurasian.)”.

== Autosomal DNA ==
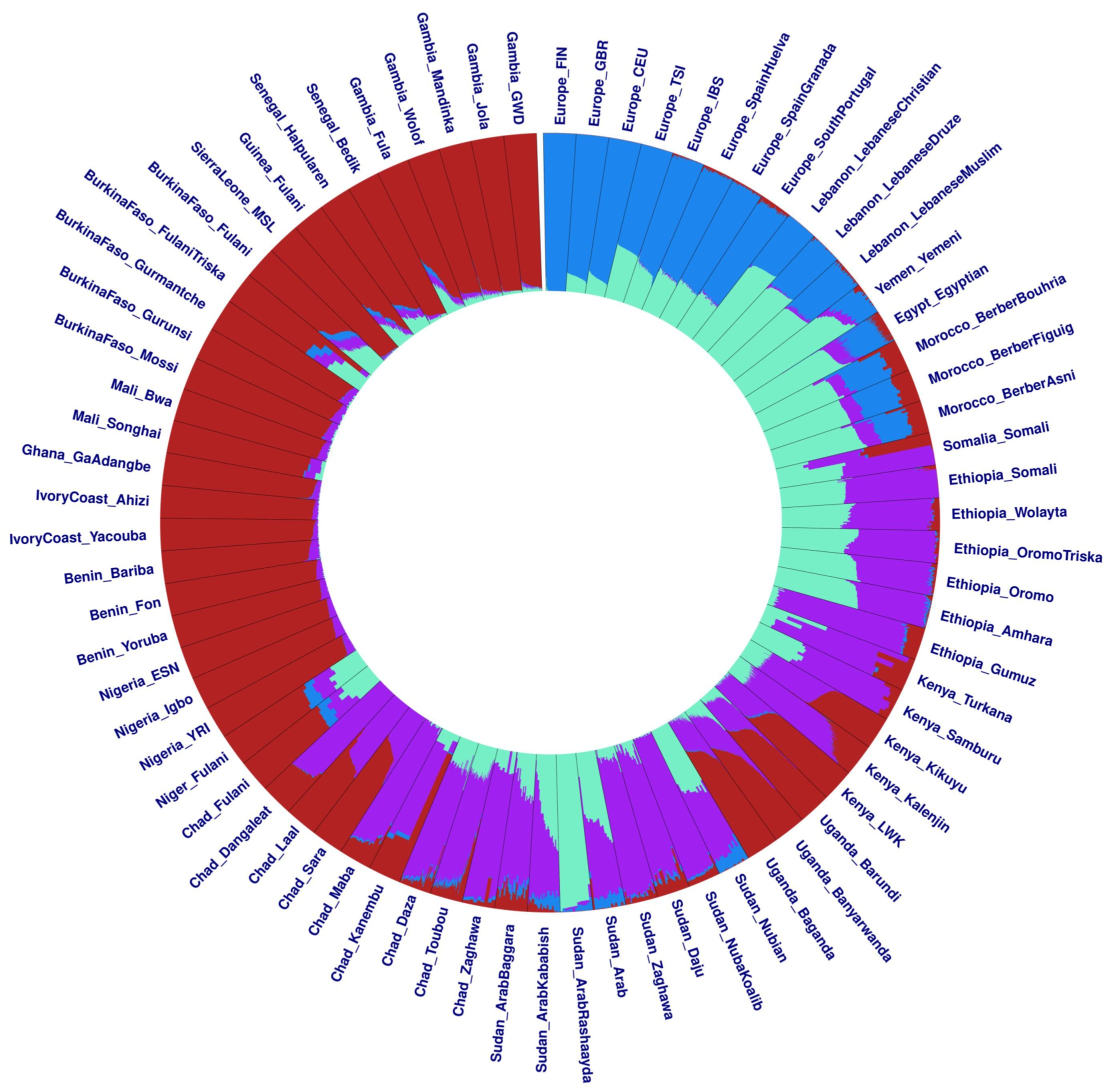
Fortes-Lima, Cesar et al. 2022, Red: West African, Purple: East African, Green: Middle Eastern, Blue: European. North Africans show high ancestry proportions from West Asia and Europe.

On 13 January 2012, an exhaustive genetic study of North Africa's human populations was published in PLoS Genetics and was undertaken jointly by researchers in the Evolutionary Biology Institute (CSIC-UPF) and Stanford University, among other institutions.

The study highlights the complex genetic makeup of North Africa. This genetic composition shows a significant local component that became more distinct around 12,000 years ago, possibly influenced by migrations, population expansions, or other demographic events. According to David Comas, coordinator of the study and researcher at the Institute for Evolutionary Biology (CSIC-UPF), "some of the questions we wanted to answer were whether today's inhabitants are direct descendants of the populations with the oldest archaeological remains in the region, dating back fifty thousand years, or whether they are descendants of the Neolithic populations in the Middle East, which introduced agriculture to the region around nine thousand years ago. We also wondered if there had been any genetic exchange between the North African populations and the neighbouring regions and if so, when these took place".

To explore these questions, the research team analyzed nearly 800,000 genetic markers across the entire genomes of 125 North African individuals from seven representative populations. This data was then juxtaposed with information from neighboring populations.

The findings reveal a distinct native genetic component in North Africans, setting them apart from sub-Saharan Africans and aligning them more closely with West-Eurasians, primarily Middle Easterners and Europeans. Though the study emphasizes a dominant genetic lineage in contemporary North Africans tracing back to around 12,000 years ago, it doesn't dismiss the likelihood of genetic continuity from ancient human groups present in North Africa over 60,000 years ago. The data suggests that while ancient human groups indeed inhabited the region, the majority of the modern identifiable genetic makeup stems from more recent periods. The unique North African (Maghrebi) genetic signature is distinct from ancestries found in the populations of sub-Saharan Africa. Modern North African populations were observed to share genetic markers in varying degrees with all the neighbouring regions (Southern Europe, West Asia, sub-Saharan Africa), probably as a result of more recent migrations.

Unlike sub-Saharan Africans, North Africans have a similar level of Neanderthal DNA to South Europeans and West Asians, which is pre-Neolithic in origin, rather than via any later admixture with peoples from outside of North Africa during the historical period. It was found that modern North Africans derive mainly from a "back to Africa" population from Eurasia "from before 12,000 years ago (ya) (i.e., prior to the Neolithic migrations)" but more recent than 40,000 years ago which seems to "represent a genetic discontinuity with the earliest modern human settlers of North Africa (those with the Aterian industry).

Hodgson et al. 2014 found a distinct non-African ancestry component among Northeastern Africans (dubbed "Ethio-Somali"), which split from other West-Eurasian ancestries, and is most closely related to the North African (Maghrebi), and Arabian ancestry components. Both would have entered Africa during a pre-agricultural period (between 12,000 and 23,000 years ago). This component is suggested to have been present in considerable amounts among the Proto-Afroasiatic-speaking peoples. The authors argue that the Ethio-Somali component and the Maghrebi component descended from a single ancestral lineage, which split from the Arabian lineage and migrated into Africa from the Middle East. That is, a common ancestral population migrated into Africa through Sinai and then split into two, with one branch continuing west across North Africa and the other heading south into the HOA.

A 2015 study by Dobon et al. identified another ancestral autosomal component of West Eurasian origin that is common to many modern Afro-Asiatic-speaking populations in Northeast Africa. Known as the Coptic component, it peaks among Egyptian Copts, including those who settled in Sudan over the past two centuries. The Coptic component evolved out of a main North African and Middle Eastern ancestral component that is shared by other Egyptians and also found at high frequencies among other populations in Northern Africa. The scientists suggest that this points to a common origin for the general population of Egypt. They also associate the Coptic component with Ancient Egyptian ancestry, without the later minority Medieval Era Arabian and sub-Saharan African influence that is present among other Egyptians.

According to a paper published in 2017, most of the genetic studies on North African populations agree with a limited correlation between genetics and geography, showing a high population heterogeneity in the region (without strong differences between Arabs and Berbers). Northern African populations have been described as a mosaic of North African (Taforalt), Middle Eastern, European (Early European Farmers) and sub-Saharan ancestries.

A recent genetic study published in the "European Journal of Human Genetics" in Nature (2019) showed that Northern Africans are closely related to West Asians as well as Europeans. Northern Africans can be distinguished from West Africans and other African populations dwelling south of the Sahara.

According to Lucas-Sánchez, Marcel et al. (2021) despite the geneflow from the Middle-East, Europe and sub-Saharan Africa, an autochthonous genetic component that dates back to pre-Holocene times is still present in North African groups. The analysis also showed as a whole no genetic pattern of differentiation between Tamazight (i.e. Berber) and Arabs.

In North Africa, research indicated that the major sub-Saharan African admixture was acquired in recent times, during the 13 to 14th century CE from West African sources, and another from the 17th century CE from East African sources. Both periods and locales were said to coincide with the peak of the trans-Saharan slave-trade.

== Ancient DNA ==
=== Maghreb ===
Ancient North African samples such as the Paleolithic Taforalt, dated between 15,100 and 13,900 yr B.P., were found to be composed of two major components: a Holocene Levantine component, and from an indigenous north African component closely related to Basal Eurasians. The Taforalt individuals show closest genetic affinity for ancient Epipaleolithic Natufian individuals, with slightly greater affinity for the Natufians than later Neolithic Levantines. A two-way admixture scenario using Levantine samples and modern West/East African samples as reference populations inferred that the Taforalt individuals bore 63.5% West-Eurasian Levantine-related and 36.5% sub-Saharan African-related ancestries, with no evidence for additional gene flow from the Epigravettian culture of Upper Paleolithic Europe. The Taforalt individuals also show evidence of limited Neanderthal ancestry.

In 2013, Iberomaurusian skeletons from the prehistoric sites of Taforalt and Afalou in the Maghreb were analyzed for ancient DNA. All of the specimens belonged to maternal clades associated with either North Africa or the northern and southern Mediterranean littoral, indicating gene flow between these areas since the Epipaleolithic. The ancient Taforalt individuals carried the mtDNA haplogroups U6, H, JT and V, which points to population continuity in the region dating from the Iberomaurusian period.

The E1b1b-M81 (~44%), R-M269 (~44%), and E-M132/E1a (~6%) paternal haplogroups have been found in ancient Guanche (Bimbapes) fossils excavated in Punta Azul, El Hierro, Canary Islands, which are dated to the 10th century. Maternally, the specimens all belong to the H1 clade. These locally born individuals carried the H1-16260 haplotype, which is exclusive to the Canary Islands and Algeria. In 2018, DNA analysis of Later Stone Age individuals from the site of Taforalt (Iberomaurusian, 15 000 BP) revealed that the Iberomaurusians carried haplogroup E-M78* and Cardial culture bearers from the site of Ifri N' Ammar (7 000 BP) carried the Levantine marker E-L19 indicating a break in continuity in the region. These studies confirmed a break in continuity in the region showing that Mesolithic Moroccans did not contribute paternally to Later Stone Age individuals and to present-day Maghrebi populations.

A 2019 study seeking to determine if North Africans descend from strictly Palaeolithic groups (Taforalt), or subsequent migrations, discovered that most of the genetic variation in the region was shaped during the Neolithic. While the ancient samples had more of the Taforalt component, it is most frequent today in Western North Africans (Saharawi, Moroccans, Algerians) and Berbers, and suggested a continuity of this autochronous North African component. The consideration of Berber-speaking groups as the autochthonous peoples of North Africa was reinforced by these results.

According to a 2024 study, individuals from the Takarkori rock shelter primarily descend from an ancestral North African lineage (93%) that was presumably widespread in North Africa after the Out of Africa migration. This lineage branched off the lineage leading to the Out of Africa migration after the ancient Mota Cave individual from Ethiopia, who represents the sub-Saharan African lineage most related to Out of African migrants. However, the ancestral North African lineage is not closely related to sub-Saharan Africans but instead, is more related to Zlatý kůň, who can be used as a proxy of Out of African ancestry. Takarkori individuals derive the rest of their ancestry from a deeply ancient Levantine source (7%), explaining their Neanderthal ancestry. Among ancient individuals, Takakori individuals are the most related to Palaeolithic and Early Neolithic Moroccan individuals (i.e. Epipalaeolithic individual from Ifri Ouberrid, 15,000-year-old foragers from Taforalt and Early Neolithic individuals from Ifri n’Amr o’Moussa) but among modern individuals, they are the most related to "FulaniA" individuals, which includes individuals from relatively less admixed Fulani herders from eight Sahelian countries. However, these Fulani individuals share less drift with Taforalt individuals.

In 2025, a study was published by Nature on a previously unknown North African genetic lineage from the African humid period (7,000 years ago). By analyzing ancient genomes from Taforalt (Morocco) and Takarkori (Libya), the researchers revealed unsuspected connections between the prehistoric populations of the Sahara and the Maghreb.

==== European and Levantine Neolithic migrations (c.5500 BC) ====
According to a 2023 genetic study, the Taforalt groups progressively mixed with European and Levantine migrations during the Neolithic from circa 5500 BC, forming two additional major genetic groups in northwestern Africa:

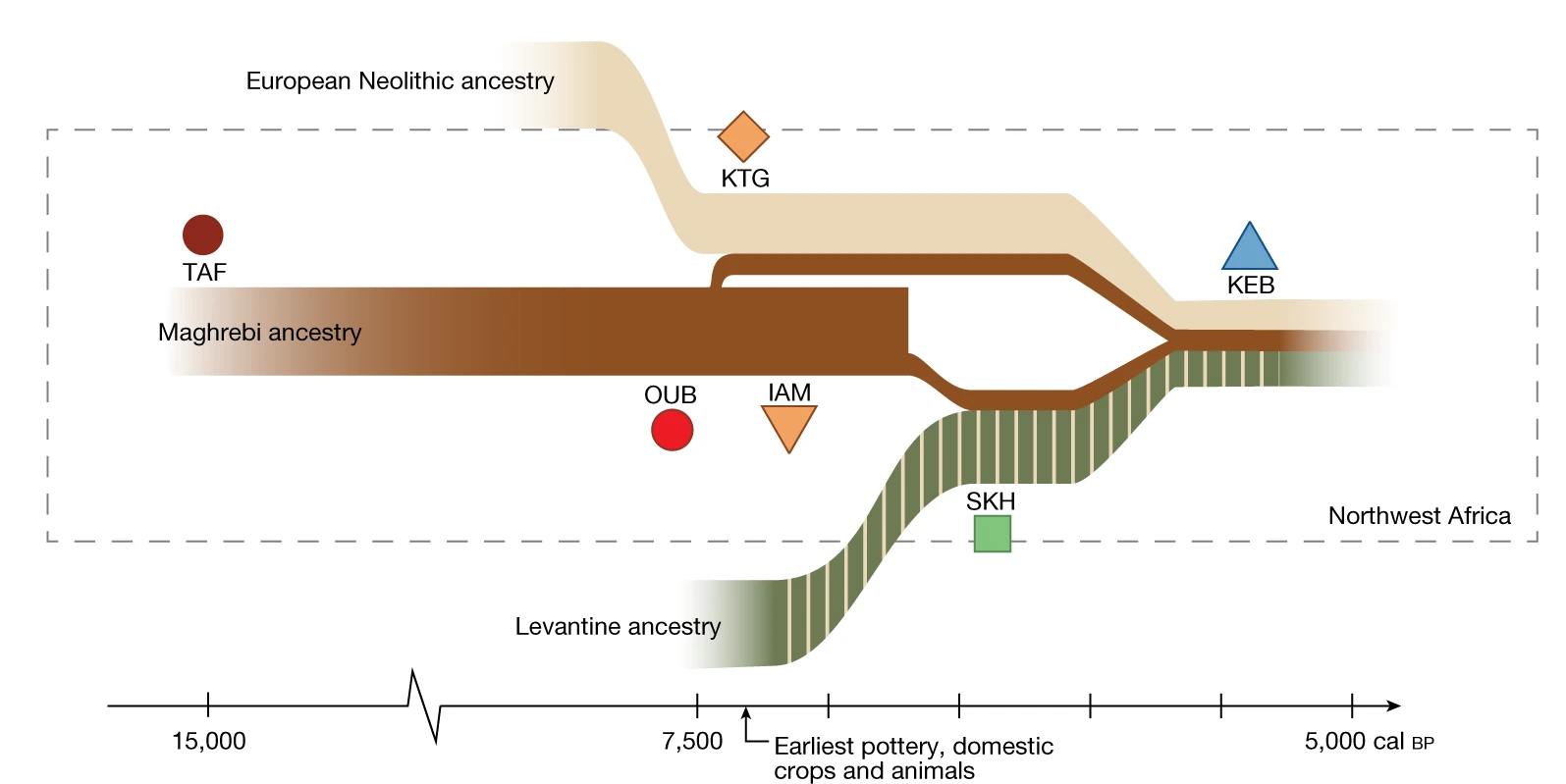
Summary of inferred population history of the Stone Age Maghreb. The Skhirat-Rouazi (SKH) branch represents a wave a Levantine migration circa 5000 BCE (■), with some local admixture (■).

- 1) The first group (■) named Kaf Taht el-Ghar (KTG, dated 5400–4900 BCE) consists of Neolithic European agriculturists who crossed the Strait of Gibraltar and settled in North Africa around 5,500 BCE, bringing a Neolithic way of life and Cardium pottery, and marginally interbreeding with the Taforalt (TAF) component (their genetic makeup is modelled at 72% Anatolian Neolithic, since Neolithic Europeans are the result of the demic expansion from Anatolia that accompanied the introduction of agriculture in Europe, 10% WHG and 18% Taforalt Maghrebi).
- 2) The second group (■) is Skhirat-Rouazi (SKH, dated 4,700–4,100 BCE), a population whose principal ancestry was introduced to Northwestern Africa during the Middle Neolithic through a westward expansion of pastoralists originating in the Levant, who entered Northeast Africa via the Sinai around 6,000 BCE, and who, around 5000 BCE, introduced animal husbandry and a distinct pottery style to Northwest Africa. This group correlates closely with the introduction of southwest Asian domesticates such as sheep, goats, and cattle, coinciding with the rise of Saharan cattle pastoralism and the appearance of Ashakar Ware pottery in the Maghreb, and may have contributed to the early dispersal of Afro-Asiatic languages across North Africa. They also admixed with local Maghrebi groups (their genetic makeup is modelled at 76% Levant Neolithic and 24% Taforalt Maghrebi). This genetic group was identified as the main ancestry of an ancient Egyptian, Old Kingdom individual (NUE001), dated to 2855–2570 BC.

These three distinct genetic groups progressively blended towards the end of the Neolithic.

=== Egypt ===
In 2013, Nature announced the publication of the first genetic study utilizing next-generation sequencing to ascertain the ancestral lineage of an Ancient Egyptian individual. The research was led by Carsten Pusch of the University of Tübingen in Germany and Rabab Khairat, who released their findings in the Journal of Applied Genetics. DNA was extracted from the heads of five Egyptian mummies that were housed at the institution. All the specimens were dated to between 806 BC and 124 AD, a timeframe corresponding with the Late Dynastic and Ptolemaic periods. The researchers observed that one of the mummified individuals likely belonged to the mtDNA haplogroup I2, a maternal clade that is believed to have originated in Western Asia.

In 2025, the UNESCO International Scientific Committee members for drafting the General History of Africa Volumes IX-XI reached the view that Egypt had African and Eurasian populations, with Upper Egypt now repositioned as the origin of pharaonic unification, with close genetic, linguistic, archaeological and anthropological affinities identified between the Upper Egyptian population and Sub-Saharan groups.

Genetic analysis of a modern Upper Egyptian population in Adaima by Eric Crubézy had identified genetic markers common across Africa, with 71% of the Adaima samples carrying E1b1 haplogroup and 3% carrying the L0f mitochondrial haplogroup. A secondary review, published in UNESCO General History of Africa Volume IX, in 2025 noted the results were preliminary and need to be confirmed by other laboratories with new sequencing methods. This was supported by an anthropological study which found the notable presence of dental markers, characteristic of Khoisan people, in a predynastic-era cemetery at Adaïma. The genetic marker E1b1 was identified in a number of genetic studies to have wide distribution across Egypt, with "P2/215/M35.1 (E1b1b), for short M35, likely also originated in eastern tropical Africa, and is predominantly distributed in an arc from the Horn of Africa up through Egypt". Multiple STR analysis of the Amarna royal mummies (including Rameses III, Tutankhamun and Amenhotep III) were deployed to estimate their ethnicity have found they had strong affinities with modern Sub-Saharan populations. Nonetheless, these forms of analysis were not exhaustive as only 8 of the 13 CODIS markers were used.

Nonetheless, UNESCO scholars Augustin Holl and Jean Gourdine both presented similar forms of criticisms, in the General History of Africa Volume IX, of the 2017 Scheunemann study in terms of its geographical coverage, general conclusions on the population of Egypt and methodological approach. Gourdine argued that there were a number of biases in the interpretation and the conclusions conflicted with other analysis such as the Amarna STR analysis, and evidence of identifiable African haplogroups such as E1b1b1, JK2955 (haplogroup L3) and JK2963 (haplogroup M1a1i), which preceded the trans-Saharan slave trade in Egypt.

=== Y-DNA of ancient North African samples ===
Name	Country	Culture	Date (Before Present)	Y-DNA Haplogroup	Genetic Profile	Study
TAF009	Morocco	Iberomaurusian	15,100-13,900	E-M78	Near-Eastern & African	Loosdrecht et al. 2018
TAF010	Morocco	Iberomaurusian	15,100-13,900	E-M78	Near-Eastern & African	Loosdrecht et al. 2018
TAF011	Morocco	Iberomaurusian	15,100-13,900	E-M78	Near-Eastern & African	Loosdrecht et al. 2018
TAF012	Morocco	Iberomaurusian	15,100-13,900	E-M78	Near-Eastern & African	Loosdrecht et al. 2018
TAF013	Morocco	Iberomaurusian	15,100-13,900	E-M78	Near-Eastern & African	Loosdrecht et al. 2018
TAF015	Morocco	Iberomaurusian	15,100-13,900	E-M78	Near-Eastern & African	Loosdrecht et al. 2018
KTG004	Morocco	Cardial	7,400-6,900	G2	European	Simoes et al. 2023
KTG006	Morocco	Cardial	7,400-6,900	G2	European	Simoes et al. 2023
IAM.4	Morocco	Cardial	7,300-6,700	E-L19	North-African	Fregel et al. 2018
IAM.5	Morocco	Cardial	7,300-6,700	E-L19	North-African	Fregel et al. 2018
SKH002	Morocco	Proto-Beaker	6,700-6,100	T	Near-Eastern	Simoes et al. 2023
SKH005	Morocco	Proto-Beaker	6,700-6,100	T	Near-Eastern	Simoes et al. 2023
KEB.6	Morocco	Proto-Beaker	5,700-5,600	T	European	Fregel et al. 2018
KEB.7	Morocco	Proto-Beaker	5,700-5,600	CT	European	Fregel et al. 2018
Nakht-Ankh	Egypt	Egyptian	4,000	H	Unknown	Drosou et al. 2018
Tuthmoses I	Egypt	Egyptian	3,450	J1	Unknown	Gad et al. 2021
Yuya	Egypt	Egyptian	3,390	G2	Unknown	Gad et al. 2021
Amenhotep III	Egypt	Egyptian	3,370	R1b	Unknown	Gad et al. 2021
Akhenaten	Egypt	Egyptian	3,350	R1b	Unknown	Gad et al. 2021
Tutankhamun	Egypt	Egyptian	3,340	R1b	Unknown	Gad et al. 2021
Ramses III	Egypt	Egyptian	3,200	E-V38	Unknown	Gad et al. 2021
Pentawer	Egypt	Egyptian	3,200	E-V38	Unknown	Gad et al. 2021
JK2134	Egypt	Egyptian	2,798-2,591	J1	Near-Eastern	Schuenemann et al. 2017
JK2911	Egypt	Egyptian	2,791-2,582	J2	Near-Eastern	Schuenemann et al. 2017
R11793	Tunisia	Punic	2,711-2,355	J2	European	Moots et al. 2023
R11746	Tunisia	Punic	2,683-2,361	R1b	European	Moots et al. 2023
R11751	Tunisia	Punic	2,678-2,359	J2	European	Moots et al. 2023
R11753	Tunisia	Punic	2,606-2,355	J2	European	Moots et al. 2023
JK2888	Egypt	Egyptian	2,119-2,024	E-V22	Near-Eastern	Schuenemann et al. 2017
R10766	Algeria	Berber	1,887-1,746	G2	North African	Antonio et al. 2022

== See also ==
- Genetic history of Africa
- Y-DNA haplogroups in populations of North Africa
- Y-DNA haplogroups in populations of the Near East
- Population history of Egypt
- Ethnic groups of North Africa
- African admixture in Europe
- Genetic studies on Jews
- Genetic studies on Arabs
- Genetic history of the Iberian Peninsula
- Genetic studies on Moroccans
- Genetic history of the Middle East
