= Karak syndrome =

- Specialty: Neurology

Karak syndrome is a neurological degenerative disorder involving excess cerebral iron accumulation. The siblings in whom the disease was discovered lived in Karak, a town in southern Jordan. It is characterized by ataxia, inverted feet (talipes calcaneovarus), dysarthric scanning speech with dystonic features, dystonic movement of the tongue and facial muscles and choreiform movement was present in both upper and lower limbs, being more marked in the lower limbs, along with dystonic posture of the distal feet, bradykinesia present in both upper and lower limbs, dysmetria, dysdiadochokinesia, and intentional tremor were bilateral and symmetrical.

== See also ==
- Neurodegeneration with brain iron accumulation
- Iron overload
