= List of Y-chromosome haplogroups in populations of the world =

The following articles are lists of human Y-chromosome DNA haplogroups found in populations around the world.

- Y-DNA haplogroups by ethnic group
- Y-DNA haplogroups in populations of Europe
- Y-DNA haplogroups in populations of the Caucasus
- Y-DNA haplogroups in populations of the Near East
- Y-DNA haplogroups in populations of North Africa
- Y-DNA haplogroups in populations of Sub-Saharan Africa
- Y-DNA haplogroups in populations of South Asia
- Y-DNA haplogroups in populations of East and Southeast Asia
- Y-DNA haplogroups in populations of Central and North Asia
- Y-DNA haplogroups in populations of Oceania
- Y-DNA haplogroups in indigenous peoples of the Americas
- List of haplogroups of historic people

== See also ==
- Recent African origin of modern humans
- Genetic history of the Middle East
- Genetics and archaeogenetics of South Asia
- Genetic history of Europe
- Genetic history of Italy
- Genetic history of North Africa
- Genetic history of Indigenous peoples of the Americas
- Genetic history of the Iberian Peninsula
- Genetic history of the British Isles
- Genetic studies on Jews
