= Y-DNA haplogroups in populations of Sub-Saharan Africa =

The proportions of various human Y-DNA haplogroups vary significantly from one ethnic or language group to another in Africa.

Data in the table below are based on genetic research. The second column designates linguistic affiliation of the sampled population (Semitic, Nilo-Saharan, Niger-Congo, etc.), the third column gives the total sample size studied, and the other columns indicate the percentage observed of particular haplogroups.

Population	Language group	n	A	B	E1a	E1b1a	E1b1b	E2	J	R1	T	Reference
Alur	Nilo-Saharan	9	22	0	0	11	0	67	0	0	0	Wood 2005
Amhara (Ethiopia)	Semitic	48	14.6	2.1	0		45.8	0	33.3	0	4.2	Hassan 2008
Bamileke	Niger-Congo	85	0	0	0	100	0	0	0	0	0	Luis 2004
Bantus (Gabon)	Niger-Congo	795	0.5	6.7	0.2	79.4	0.1	6.2	0	5.5	0	Berniell 2009
Bantus (Kenya)	Niger-Congo	29	13.8	3.4	0	51.7	13.7	17.2	0	0	0	Hurles 2005
Bantus (Tanzania) (Note: Tanzania: Turu, Mbugwe, Wairak, Sukuma.)	Niger-Congo	110	2.7	9.1		48.2	21.8	16.4	0	0	1.8	
Bantus (South Africa) (Note: South Africa: Sotho–Tswana, Xhosa, Zulu.)	Niger-Congo	137	5.1	10.9	0	54.7	4.4	21.2	0	0	0	Wood 2005
Bantus (South-Eastern)	Niger-Congo	343	5.0	16.3		66.2	1.5	10.2		0		Naidoo 2010
Beja	Cushitic	42	4.8	0	0	0	52.4	0	38.1	4.8	0	Hassan 2008
Benin (Fon)	Niger-Congo	100	0	0	0	95	0	5	0	0	0	Luis 2004
Berbers	Berber	64	3	0	2	5	80	0	6	0	0	Cruciani2002
Bissagos Islands	Niger–Congo	21				76.2	14.3					Rosa 2007
Burkina Faso (Note: Burkina Faso ethnic groups: Mossi, Rimaibe, Fulbe.)	Niger–Congo	106	0	0.9	3.8	81.1	2.8	11.3	0	0	0	Cruciani2002
Burunge	Cushitic	24	0	25		4	33					Tishkoff 2007
Cameroon (North) (Note: Adamawa Cameroon: Fali, Tali, mixed.)	Niger-Congo	72	1.4	12.5	4.2	54.2	0	0	0	27.8	0	Cruciani2002
Cameroon (North) (Note: Chadic Cameroon: Ouldeme, Daba, mixed.)	Chadic	54	1.8	3.7	0	13.0	3.7	7.4	0	70.4	0	Cruciani2002
Cameroon (South) (Note: Southern Cameroon: Bamileke, Ewondo, Bakaka.)	Niger-Congo	89	0	5.6	0	93.3	0	0	0	1.1	0	Cruciani2002
Cape Verdeans	Indo-European	143	0	0	3	28	14	0	4	44	1	Costa2025
R.D. Congo (East) (Note: RDC: Nande, Hema.)	Niger-Congo	36	2.8	0	0	63.9	13.9	19.4	0	0	0	Wood 2005
Copts (Sudan)	Egyptian	33	0	15.2	0	0	21.2	0	45.5	15.2		Hassan 2008
Cross River (Nigeria)	Niger-Congo	1113	0			87			0	0	0	Veeramah2010
Datog	Nilo-Saharan	35	3	3		11	54					Tishkoff 2007
Daza (Chad)	Nilo-Saharan						11.1		5.6	33.3	44.4	Shriner 2018
Dinka	Nilo-Saharan	26	62	23	0	0	15	0	0	0	0	Hassan 2008
Dogon	Dogon	55	1.8	7.3	45.5	43.6	0	1.8	0	0	0	Wood 2005
Ethiopians	Semitic	242	17.8	0.8	0		48.8	0.4	26.9	0	3.7	Moran 2004
Ethiopian Jews	Semitic	22	41	0	0	0	50	0	5	0	5	Cruciani2002
Fulbe (Burkina Faso & Cameroon)	Niger-Congo	37	5.4	0	29.7	48.6		0	0		8.1	Cruciani2002
Fulbe (Guinea-Bissau)	Niger-Congo	59				13.6				1.7		Rosa 2007
Fulbe (Sudan)	Niger-Congo	26	0	0	0	0	34.6	0	0	53.8	0	Hassan 2008
Fulbe (Niger)	Niger-Congo	7								14.3		Cruciani2010
Fur	Nilo-Saharan	32	31.3	3.1	0	0	59.4	0	6.3	0	0	Hassan 2008
Ghana (Note: Ghana: Ewe, Ga, Fante.)	Niger-Congo	91	0	0	2.2	92.3	1.1	0	0	1.1	0	Wood 2005
Guinea-Bissau	Niger-Congo	282	3.2	0.4	15.6	72.0	6.0	0.7	0	0.7	0	Rosa 2007
Hadza	Hadza (Isolate)	80	0	57.5		26.2	15.0					Tishkoff 2007
Hausa (Sudan)	Chadic	32	12.5	15.6	0	12.5	3.1	0	0	40.6	0	Hassan 2008
Hausa (Nigeria)	Chadic	81	9	5	6	43				32		Nguidi 2024
Hema	Niger-Congo	18	6	0	2.2	28	28	39	0	0	0	Wood 2005
Herero	Niger-Congo	24			4.2	70.8				12.5		I = 4.2%; R1a = 4.2%. (Wood 2005)
Hutu (Rwanda)	Niger-Congo	69	0	4	0	83	3	8	0	1	0	Luis 2004
Igbo (Note: Calculated by averaging the haplogroup frequencies of the IG-C (Calabar), IG-E (Enugu) and IG-N (Nenwe) Igbo samples (see Table 1) in Table 4.)	Niger-Congo	209	A3b2=0			89.3			0		0	Veeramah 2010
Iraqw	Cushitic	9	0	22	0	11	56	0	0	0	0	Wood 2005
Kanembu	Nilo-Saharan		0	50	0	0	0	0	0	50	0	Shriner 2018
Khoisan (Note: Khoisan: !Kung/Sekele, Tsumkwe San, Dama, Nama.)	Khoisan	90	47.7	14.4	0	24.4	6.7	2.2	1.1	0	0	Wood 2005
Khoisan	Khoisan	183	44.3	11.5	0	23.0	16.4	1.6	0	1.6	0	Naidoo 2010
Khoisan (South Africa) (Note: Khoisan from South Africa: Khwe, !Kung, and mixed.)	Khoisan	129	33.3	12.4	0	35.7	14.7	3.9	0	0	0	Tishkoff 2007
Kikuyu & Kamba	Niger-Congo	42	2	2	0	73	19	0	0	0	0	Wood 2005
ǃKung	Khoisan	64	36	8	0	39	11	6	0	0	0	Cruciani2002
Luo	Nilo-Saharan	9	11	22	0	66	0	0	0	0	0	Wood 2005
Maasai	Nilo-Saharan	26	27	8	0	16	50	0	0	0	0	Wood 2005
Malagasy	Austronesian	35	0	8.6	0	34.3	0	8.6	5.7		0	O = 34.3% (Hurles 2005)
Mandinka	Niger-Congo	39	5	3	3	79	8	3	0	0	0	Wood 2005
Mandinka (Guinea-Bissau)	Niger-Congo	45				86.7	4.4					Rosa 2007
Masalit	Nilo-Saharan	32	18.8	3.1	0	0	71.9	0	6.3	0	0	Hassan 2008
Mossi	Niger-Congo	49	0	2		90	2					Tishkoff 2007
Namibia (Nama)	Khoisan	11	64	0	0	18	9	0	0		0	Wood 2005
Nande	Niger-Congo	18	0	0	0	100	0	0	0	0	0	Wood 2005
Niger–Congo (Note: Niger–Congo from: Gambia, Senegal, Mali, Ghana, Cameroon, CAR, DRC, Tanzania, Kenya, Uganda, Namibia, South Africa, and Zimbabwe.)	Niger-Congo	705	2.7	9.6	4.5	68.2	3.9	6.9	0.1	1.4	0	Wood 2005
Nilo-Saharan (Note: Nilo-Saharan: Alur, Mbuti (R.D.Congo), Massai, Luo (Kenya). Clade was exclusively carried by the Maasai amongst the Nilo-Saharan speakers - Appendix A)	Nilo-Saharan	91	12.1	35.2	0	29.7	14.3	8.8	0	0	0	Wood 2005
Nilo-Saharan (Note: Nilo-Saharan: 14 populations from R.D.Congo, Kenya, Sudan, Tanzania and Cameroon)	Nilo-Saharan	345	23.2	17.4		9.9	33.9	2.6	6.1			Wood 2005, Hassan 2008, Tishkoff 2007, Cruciani 2002
Nubians (Egypt)	Nilo-Saharan	46	0	0	0	0	86.9	0	4.4	0	0	Lucotte and Mercier 2003
Nubians (Sudan)	Nilo-Saharan, Semitic	39	0	7.7	0	0	23.1	0	43.6	10.3	0	Hassan 2008
Nuba	Nilo-Saharan	28	46.4	14.3	0	0	39.3	0	0	0	0	Hassan 2008
Nuer	Nilo-Saharan	12	33.3	50	0	0	16.7	0	0	0	0	Hassan 2008
Oromo (Ethiopia)	Cushitic	78	10.3	1.3	0		62.8	1.3	3.8	0	5.1	Hassan 2008
Ouldeme	Chadic	13								95.5		Cruciani2010
Pygmy (Mbuti)	Nilo-Saharan	47	2	59	0	34	0	4	0	0	0	Wood 2005
Pygmy (Western) (Note: Pygmies: Baka, Bakola.)	Niger-Congo	60	5	53.3		28.3	0		0	3.3	0	Berniell 2009
São Tomé and Príncipe	Indo-European	150	1.3	0	0	84.0	0		0	8.7	0	Gonçalves 2008
Sandawe	Sandawe (Isolate)	68	4	14		43	34					Tishkoff 2007
Senegalese	Niger-Congo	139	0	0	5.0	81.3	6.5	2.9	0	0	0	Hassan 2008
Shilluk	Nilo-Saharan	15	53.3	26.7	0	0	20	0	0	0	0	Hassan 2008
Shuwa Arabs	Semitic	5								40		Cruciani2010
Somalis	Cushitic	201	0.5	1.0	0	1.5	81.1	0.5	3.0	0	10.4	R1a=1, Sanchez2005
South African Whites	Indo-European	157	0	0	0.6	0.6	9.6	0	3.8	51.6		Others=33.8
Sudanese Arabs (Note: Northern Sudan: Gaalien, Meseria, Arakien.)	Semitic	102	2.9	0	0	0	16.7	0	47.1	15.7	0	Hassan 2008
South Sudan (Nilotic) (Note: South Sudan: Dinka, Shilluk, Nuer.)	Nilo-Saharan	81	50.6	24.7	0	0	24.7	0	0		0	Hassan 2008
West Sudan (Darfur) (Note: Western Sudan: Fur, Masalit, Borgu. Clade introduced from North Africa. High frequencies likely due to a population bottleneck.)	Nilo-Saharan	90	27.8	2.2	0	0	62.2	0	4.4		0	Hassan 2008
Tuareg (Burkina Faso) (Note: Tgor: Tuareg from Burkina Faso, around the village of Gorom-Gorom.)	Berber	38			0	16.7	77.8	0		0		Pereira 2010
Tuareg (Mali) (Note: Tgos: Tuareg from Mali, near Gossi.)	Berber	21			0	9.1	90.9	0		0		Pereira 2010
Tuareg (Niger) (Note: Ttan: Tuareg from Niger, in the vicinity of Tanut.)	Berber	31			0	44.4	16.7	0		33.3		Pereira 2010
Tutsi (Rwanda)	Niger-Congo	94	0	15	0	80	1	4	0	0	0	Luis 2004
Wolof	Niger-Congo	34	0	0	12.0	68.0	12.0	3.0	0	0		Wood 2005
Yoruba	Niger-Congo	13	0	8	0	92	0	0	0	0	0	Tishkoff 2007
Yoruba	Niger-Congo	28				93.1						IHC 2005
Yoruba	Niger-Congo	21								4.8		Cruciani 2010
Xhosa	Niger-Congo	80	5	5	0	54	5	28	0	0	0	Wood 2005
Zulu	Niger-Congo	29	3	20	0	55	0	21	0	0	0	Wood 2005

== See also ==
- Africa
  - African empires
  - Ethnic groups in Africa
  - African people
  - Languages of Africa
- Y-DNA haplogroups by population
  - Y-DNA haplogroups in populations of the Near East
  - Y-DNA haplogroups in populations of North Africa
  - Y-DNA haplogroups in populations of Europe
  - Y-DNA haplogroups in populations of the Caucasus
  - Y-DNA haplogroups in populations of South Asia
  - Y-DNA haplogroups in populations of East and Southeast Asia
  - Y-DNA haplogroups in populations of Oceania
  - Y-DNA haplogroups in populations of Central and North Asia
  - Y-DNA haplogroups in indigenous peoples of the Americas
