= Y-DNA haplogroups in populations of South Asia =

Y-DNA haplogroups in populations of South Asia are haplogroups of the male Y-chromosome found in South Asian populations.

== Major Y-chromosome DNA haplogroups in South Asia ==
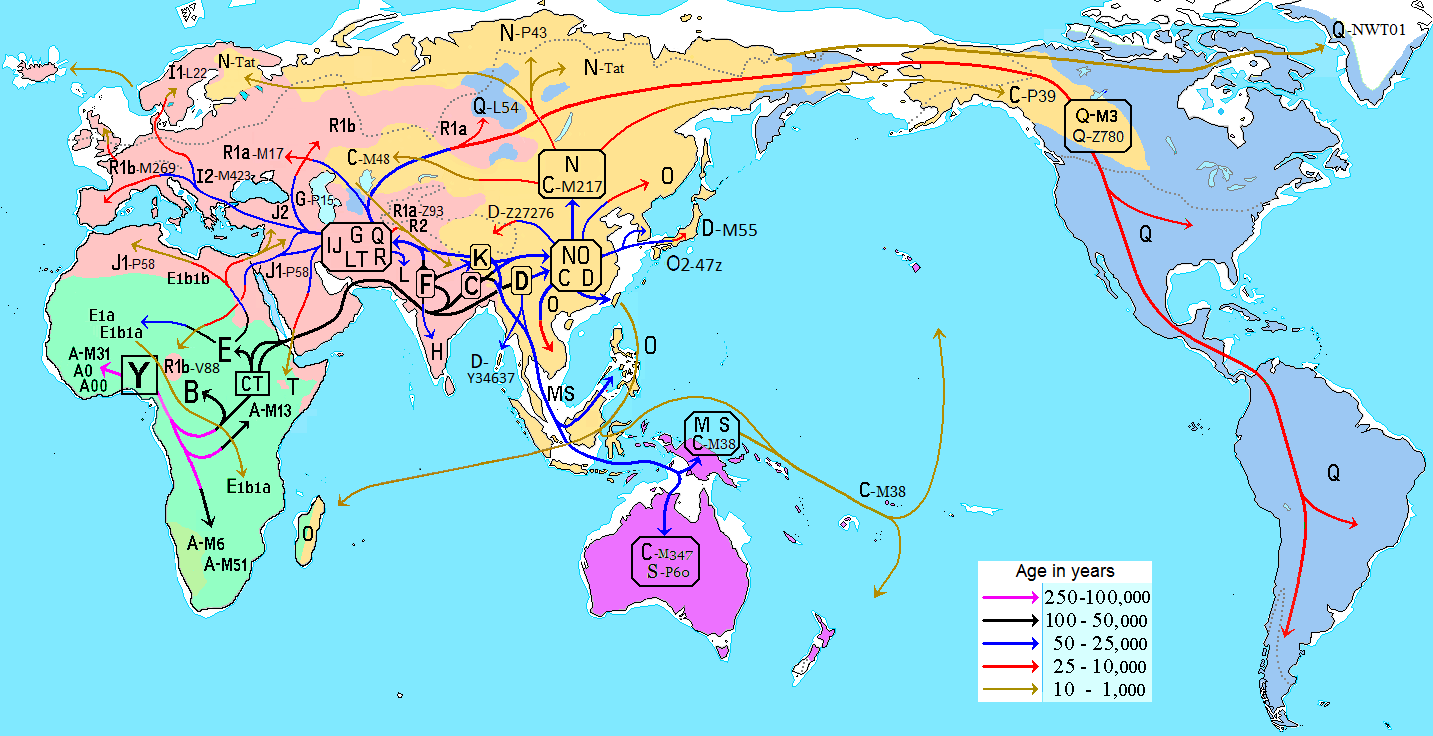
World map of early migrations of modern human beings based on the Y-chromosome DNA.

South Asia, located on the crossroads of Western Eurasia and Eastern Eurasia, accounts for about 39.49% of Asia's population, and over 24% of the world's population. It is home to a vast array of people who belong to diverse ethnic groups, who migrated to the region during different periods of time.

The presence of Himalayas in northern and eastern borders of South Asia have limited migrations from Eastern Eurasia into Indian subcontinent in the past. Hence most of the male-mediated migrations into South Asia occurred from Western Eurasia into the region, as seen in the Y-chromosome DNA Haplogroup variations of populations in the region.

The major paternal lineages of South Asian populations, represented by Y chromosomes, are haplogroups R1a1, R2, H, L, and J2, as well as O-M175 in some parts (northeastern region) of the Indian subcontinent. Haplogroup R is the most observed Y-chromosome DNA haplogroup among the populations of South Asia, followed by H, L, and J, in the listed order. These four haplogroups together constitute nearly 80% of all male Y-chromosome DNA haplogroups found in various populations of the region.

The Y-chromosome DNA Haplogroups R1a1, R2, L, and J2, which are found in higher frequencies among various populations of the Indian subcontinent, are also observed among various populations of Europe, Central Asia, and Middle East.

Some researchers have argued that Y-DNA Haplogroup R1a1 (M17) is of autochthonous South Asian origin. However, proposals for a Eurasian Steppe origin for R1a1 are also quite common and supported by several more recent studies. The spread of R1a1 in Indian subcontinent is associated with Indo-Aryan migrations into the region from South Central Asia that occurred around 3,500–4,000 years before present. The R1a-Z93 paternal genetic in Romani people was also discovered. Indian-Brahmin origin of paternal haplogroup R1a1*.

The Haplogroup R2 is mainly restricted to various populations of South Asia, in addition to some populations of South Central Asia, Middle East, Asia Minor and the Caucasus where it is observed in low frequencies. R2 has higher frequency among the speakers of the Indo-Aryan languages as compared to Dravidian speakers of South India.

The Haplogroup H (also known as the "Indian marker"), which is a direct descendant of the Upper Paleolithic Eurasian Haplogroup HIJK, is mostly restricted to South Asian populations of the Indian subcontinent, in addition to some populations of South Central Asia and eastern Iranian Plateau, where it is found in low frequencies. It originated somewhere in the Middle East or South Central Asia and travelled to South Asia and adjoining areas of the eastern Iranian Plateau around 40,000–50,000 years before present.

The Haplogroup L, which is thought to have originated near Pamir Mountains of present-day Tajikistan in South Central Asia, travelled throughout Indian subcontinent during the Neolithic period, and it is associated with the spread of the Bronze Age Indus Valley Civilisation (IVC) in South Asia, which existed around 3,300–5,300 years before present. It is also observed among many populations of the Iranian Plateau. The spread of the Haplogroup J2 from Iranian Plateau into Indian subcontinent also occurred during the Neolithic period, alongside L.

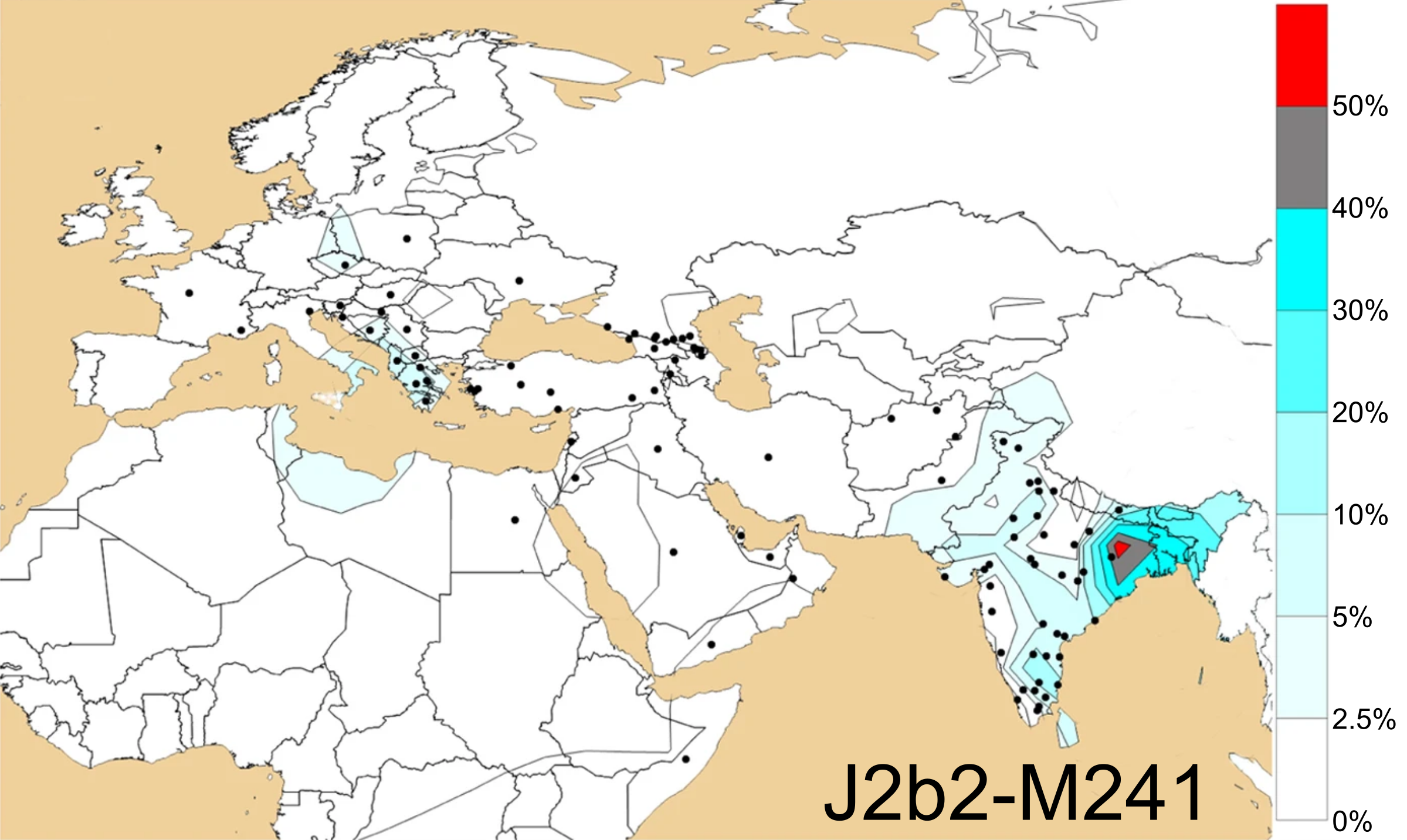
frequency distribution of Y-DNA haplogroup J2b2-M241

The Haplogroup O-M175, which is a major haplogroup observed among the populations of East and Southeast Asia, is found largely restricted among the Tibeto-Burman and Austroasiatic speakers largely restricted to the Himalayan, northeastern and east-central regions of South Asia.

== Frequencies in South Asian ethnic groups ==
Listed below are some notable groups and populations from South Asia by human Y-chromosome DNA haplogroups based on various relevant studies.

The samples are taken from individuals identified with specific linguistic designations (IE=Indo-European, Dr=Dravidian, AA=Austro-Asiatic, ST=Sino-Tibetan) and individual linguistic groups, the third column (n) gives the sample size studied, and the other columns give the percentage of the respective haplogroups.

Majority of the Indo-European (IE) speakers of South Asia speak Indo-Aryan languages, followed by Iranian languages, both of which belong to Indo-Iranian branch of the Indo-European language family. They form around 75% of the South Asian populations.

The Dravidian (Dr) speakers of South Asia are mostly clustered in South India and Balochistan, as well as parts of Central India. They form around 20% of the South Asian populations.

The Sino-Tibetan (ST) speakers in the Himalayas and northeastern parts of the South Asia speak various languages belonging to Tibeto-Burman branch of the Sino-Tibetan language family.

The Austroasiatic (AA) speakers of South Asia are scattered in parts of Central, Eastern and Northeastern India as well in parts of Nepal and Bangladesh.

Note: The converted frequencies from some old studies conducted in 2000s may lead to unsubstantial frequencies below. Table below has been sorted in alphabetical order based on the name of the population.

Frequencies of Y chromosome DNA haplogroups in some selected ethnic groups of South Asia
Population	Language (if specified)	n	C	E	F	G	H	I	J	K	L	N	O	P	Q	R	R1	R1a	R1b	R2	T	Others	Reference
Andhra Tribals (Andhra Pradesh, India)	Dr (Telugu)	29	0	0	10.3%	3.4%	34.5%	0	3.4%	0	6.9%	0	6.9%	0	0	0	0	27.6%	0	6.9%	0		Fornarino2009
Balochi (Balochistan, Pakistan)	IE (Balochi)	25	0	8%	0	0	4%	0	16%	0	24%	0	0	0	0	0	8%	20%	8%	12%	0		Sengupta2006
Bengalis (Bangladesh)	IE (Bengali)	42	7.14%	0	0	4.72%	35.71%	0	11.9%	0	4.76%	0	9.52%	0	2.38%	0	0	21.43%	0	7.14%	0		Poznik2016
Bengalis (Bangladesh)	IE (Bengali)	649	0	2.62%	0	1.08%	17.72%	4.16%	15.72%	0	17.41%	0.46%	0	0	6.93%	0	0	31.59%	0.62%	0	0		Hasan2019
Bengalis (West Bengal, India)	IE (Bengali)	31	3.2%	0	3.2%	3.2%	9.7%	0	9.7%	0	0	0	3.2%	0	0	0	0	38.7%	6.5%	22.6%	0		Kivisild2003
Bhargavas (Uttar Pradesh, India)	IE (Indo-Aryan)	96	6.3%	0	4.2%	0	16.7%	0	6.3%	4.2%	0	0	2.1%	4.2%	0	0	0	22.9%	1%	32.3%	0		Zhao2009
Bihar Paswan (Bihar, India)	IE (Bihari)	27	0	0	3.7%	11.11%	14.81%	0	3.7%	0	7.41%	0	3.7%	0	0	3.7%	11.11%	40.74%	0	0	0		Sharma2009
Bihari Brahmins (Bihar, India)	IE (Bihari)	38	2.63%	0	0	0	0	0	2.63%	5.26%	13.16%	0	0	0	5.26%	0	5.26%	60.53%	0	5.26%	0		Sharma2009
Brahmins (India)	IE (Indo-Aryan), Dr (Dravidian)	118	10.2%	0	2.5%	1.7%	11.9%	0	11.9%	1.7%	2.5%	0	4.2%	3.4%	0	0	0	28%	1.7%	20.3%	0		Zhao2009
Brahui (Balochistan, Pakistan)	Dr (Brahui)	25	4%	0	0	16%	4%	0	28%	0	8%	0	4%	0	0	0	0	24%	0	12%	0		Sengupta2006
Burusho (Gilgit-Baltistan, Pakistan)	Isolate (Burushaski)	97	8.2%	0	1%	1%	4.1%	0	8.2%	0	16.5%	0	3.1%	1%	2.1%	0	0	27.9%	0	14.4%	0%		Firasat2006
Chamar (Uttar Pradesh, India)	IE (Indo-Aryan)	18	5.6%	0	0	0	44.4%	0	0	0	0	0	0	0	0	0	0	38.9%	0	11.1%	0		Sengupta2006
Chaturvedis (Uttar Pradesh, India)	IE (Hindi)	88	9.1%	0	3.4%	0	6.8%	0	12.5%	4.5%	2.3%	0	2.3%	3.4%	0	0	0	23.9%	0	31.8%	0		Zhao2009
Chenchu (Andhra Pradesh, India)	Dr (Telugu)	41	4.9%	0	0	0	36.6%	0	7.3%	0	14.6%	0	0	0	0	0	0	26.8%	2.4%	7.3%	0		Kivisild2003
Dawoodi Bohra (Gujarat, India)	IE (Gujarati)	50	2%	0	4%	0	26%	0	8%	0	6%	0	0	8%	0	0	0	30%	0	16%	0		Eaaswarkhanth2009
Dawoodi Bohra (Tamil Nadu, India)	IE (Urdu)	26	0	0	0	0	38.5%	0	0	0	7.7%	0	0	0	0	0	0	53.9%	0	0	0		Eaaswarkhanth2009
Gujarat Bhils (Gujarat, India)	IE (Bhil)	22	9.09%	0	0	0	27.27%	0	18.18%	0	18.18%	0	0	0	0	0	0	9.09%	0	18.18%	0		Sharma2009
Gujarat Brahmins (Gujarat, India)	IE (Gujarati)	64	3.33%	3.33%	0	10.94%	1.56%	0	15.63%	3.13%	7.81%	3.13%	0	0	0	0	9.38%	32.81%	0	9.38%	0		Sharma2009
Gujarati Indians (USA)	IE (Gujarati)	58	20.69%	0	0	3.45%	20.69%	0	8.62%	0	8.62%	0	0	0	0	0	0	27.59%	1.72%	8.62%	0		Poznik2016
Gujaratis (Gujarat, India)	IE (Gujarati)	29	17.2%	0	0	0	13.8%	0	20.7%	0	10.4%	0	0	3.5%	0	3.5%	0	24.1%	0	3.5%	3.5%		Kivisild2003
Hazara (Balochistan, Pakistan)	IE (Hazaragi)	25	40%	0	0	0	0	4%	4%	0	0	0	8%	0	8%	0	0	0	32%	4%	0		Sengupta2006
Himachal Brahmin (Himachal Pradesh, India)	IE (Pahari)	19	5.26%	0	15.79%	0	10.53%	0	5.26%	0	5.26%	0	0	0	0	0	5.26%	47.37%	0	5.26%	0		Sharma2009
India	IE (Indo-Aryan), Dr (Dravidian), AA (Austroasiatic), ST (Tibeto-Burman)	728	1.8%	0	5.2%	1.2%	26.4%	0	9.3%	0	18.7%	0	23.9%	0	0.4%	0	0	27.3%	0.5%	9.3%	0		Sengupta2006
India	IE (Indo-Aryan), Dr (Dravidian), AA (Austroasiatic), ST (Tibeto-Burman)	1152	1.4%	0	3%	0.1%	23%	0	9.1%	0	17.5%	0	18%	2.7%	0	0	0	28.3%	0.5%	13.5%	3.1%		Trivedi2007
India	IE (Indo-Aryan), Dr (Dravidian), AA (Austroasiatic), ST (Tibeto-Burman)	1,615	0	0	0	0	0	0	0	0	0	0	0	0	1.3%	0	0	0	0	0	0		Sharma2007
India (Central)	IE (Indo-Aryan), Dr (Dravidian)	50	0	0	4%	2%	20%	0	4%	0	4%	0	8%	0	0	0	0	50%	0	6%	0%		Sahoo2006
India (East)	IE (Indo-Aryan), AA (Austroasiatic), Dr (Dravidian)	367	0.8%	0	2.7%	0	19.3%	0	4.1%	0	1.9%	0	20.7%	2.7%	0	0	0	23.2%	0	15.5%	3.8%		Sahoo2006
India (West)	IE (Indo-Aryan)	204	5.4%	0	0.5%	0	33.3%	0	11.3%	0	11.8%	0	0	2.5%	0	0	0	35%	0	6.4%	0.5%		Sahoo2006
India (North)	IE (Indo-Aryan), ST (Tibeto-Burman)	180	0	0	1.1%	0.6%	24.5%	0	7.8%	0	1.7%	0	2.3%	0	0	0	0	48.9%	0.6%	11.1%	0%		Trivedi2007
India (Northeast)	ST (Tibeto-Burman)	108	0	0	0	0	0.9%	0	0	0	0	0	79.7%	4.6%	0	0	0	1.9%	0	0	0		Trivedi2007
India (S. Gujarat tribals)	IE (Indo-Aryan)	284	8.5%	0	4.2%	0	40.1%	0	10.2%	2.8%	3.2%	0	0	0	2.8%	0	0	18.7%	0	9.5%	0		Khurana2014
India (South)	Dr (Dravidian)	372	1.9%	0	4%	0	27.5%	0	19.7%	0	10.8%	0	0	1.6%	0	0	0	26.7%	1.3%	21.5%	5.1%		Trivedi2007
India Shia (Uttar Pradesh, India)	IE (Urdu)	161	3.7%	1.9%	5.6%	5%	8.6%	0	28.7%	0	0	0	0.6%	5%	0	0	3.7%	27.9%	0	9.3%	0		Eaaswarkhanth2009
Indian Dravidians	Dr (Dravidian)	353	1.7%	0	9.3%	2.3%	32.9%	0	19.7%	0	11.6%	0	13.6%	0	0.3%	0	0	26.7%	0.3%	6.2%	0		Sengupta2006
Indian Indo-Europeans	IE (Indo-Aryan)	205	2.4%	0	2.4%	0.5%	28.8%	0	11.3%	0	3.9%	0	4.9%	0	1%	0	0	48.9%	1.5%	13.7%	0		Sengupta2006
Indian Munda	AA (Munda)	892	0	0	4%	0	23.1%	0	3.9%	0	0	0	57.2%	1.8%	0	0	0	5.4%	0	4.4%	0		Kumar2007
Indian Sunni (Uttar Pradesh, India)	IE (Urdu)	129	0	0	3.1%	2.3%	14%	0	20.1%	2.3%	3.1%	0	0	1.5%	0	0	2.3%	39.5%	0	11.6%	0		Eaaswarkhanth2009
Indian tribes	IE (Indo-Aryan), Dr (Dravidian), AA (Austroasiatic), ST (Tibeto-Burman)	505	2.2%	0	2%	0.2%	21.2%	0	2.6%	0	3.2%	0	40.6%	3.2%	0	0	0	7.9%	1%	6.1%	4.2%		Trivedi2007
Indian Sino-Tibetans	ST (Tibeto-Burman)	87	1.1%	0	0	0	2.3%	0	0	0	0	0	86.2%	0	0	0	0	4.6%	0	5.7%	0		Sengupta2006
Indian Telugus (UK)	Dr (Telugu)	60	1.67%	0	0	0	26.67%	0	6.67%	0	1.67%	1.67%	0	0	1.67%	0	0	26.67%	0	20%	0		Poznik2016
India's Lower Castes	IE (Indo-Aryan), Dr (Dravidian)	261	0.8%	0	4.6%	0	27.6%	0	3.1%	0	5.4%	0	0.4%	2.3%	0	0	0	15.7%	0	27.6%	4.6%		Trivedi2007
India's Middle Castes	IE (Indo-Aryan), Dr (Dravidian)	175	0.6%	0	5.1%	0	21.1%	0	9.7%	0	5.7%	0	0	2.9%	0	0	0	26.3%	0	18.9%	1.7%		Trivedi2007
India's Upper Castes	IE (Indo-Aryan), Dr (Dravidian)	211	0.9%	0	1.9%	0	23.3%	0	10%	0	11.4%	0	0	1.9%	0	0	0	30.5%	0.5%	9%	0		Trivedi2007
Indo-Aryan Castes (India)	IE (Indo-Aryan)	29	5.3%	0	3.6%	0.6%	6.5%	0	16.6%	1.2%	11.2%	0	1.2%	4.1%	0	0	0	40.2%	0	8.9%	0		Cordaux2004
Iranian Shia (Andhra Pradesh, India)	IE (Indo-Aryan)	25	0	0	16%	8%	4%	0	24%	28%	0	0	0	0	0	0	0	4%	0	16%	0		Eaaswarkhanth2009
Jats (India and Pakistan)	IE (various)	302	0	1%	0	3.6%	3.6%	1%	9.6%	0	36.8%	0	0	0	15.6%	28.5%	0	0	0	0	0.3%		Mahal2017
J&K Kashmir Gujars (Jammu and Kashmir, India)	IE (Gujari)	49	2.04%	0	4.08%	0	10.2%	0	6.12%	8.16%	16.33%	0	0	0	2%	0	2.04%	40.86%	0	8.16%	0		Sharma2009
J&K Kashmiri Pandits (Jammu and Kashmir, India)	IE (Kashmiri)	51	1.96%	0	3.92%	1.96%	9.8%	0	9.8%	9.8%	5.88%	0	0	0	5.88%	1.96%	11.76%	23.53%	0	13.73%	0		Sharma2009
Kalash (Khyber Pakhtunkhwa, Pakistan)	IE (Kalasha)	44	0	0	0	18.2%	20.5%	0	9.1%	0	25%	0	0	0	0	0	0	18.2%	0	0	0		Firasat2006
Kalash (Kalasha Valleys, Pakistan)	IE (Kalasha)	98	0	0	0	19%	7%	0	27%	0	6%	0	0	0	6%	0	0	2%	0	33%	0		Shahid2025
Kathmandu (Nepal)	IE (Indo-Aryan), ST (Tibeto-Burman)	77	7.8%	0	0	0	11.7%	0	10.4%	0	0	0	20.8%	0	1.3%	0	0	35.1%	0	10.4%	0		Gayden2007
Khasi (Meghalaya, India)	AA (Khasi)	92	0	0	10.9%	0	6.5%	0	0	0	0	0	72.8%	4.4%	0	0	0	0	0	0	0		Kumar2007
Kodava (Karnataka, India)	Dr (Kodava)	50	2%	0	2%	0	8%	0	16%	0	18%	0	0	0	0	0	0	38%	0	16%	0		NI-Shodhganga
Khasi (Bangladesh)	AA (Khasi)	90	0	12.75%	0	0	3.92%	0	9.80%	0	45.10%	0	0	0	15.69%	0	0	12.75%	0	0	0		Hasan2019
Kokanastha Brahmin (Maharashtra, India)	IE (Marathi)	25	0	0	0	0	12%	0	28%	0	4%	0	0	0	0	0	0	40%	0	20%	0		Sengupta2006
Konkanastha Brahmins (Maharashtra, India)	IE (Marathi)	43	2.3%	0	2.3%	0	9.3%	0	14%	2.3%	18.6%	0	0	0	0	0	0	41.9%	0	9.3%	0		Kivisild2003
Koraga Tribals (Karnataka, India)	Dr (Koraga)	33	0	0	0	0	87.9%	0	0	0	0	0	0	0	0	0	0	0	0	6.1%	0	DE=6.1%	Cordaux2004
Koya (Andhra Pradesh and Telangana, India)	Dr (Koya)	41	0	0	26.8%	0	70.7%	0	0	0	0	0	0	0	0	0	0	2.4%	0	0	0		Kivisild2003
Lambadi (Andhra Pradesh, India)	IE (Lambadi)	35	17.1%	0	2.9%	0	8.6%	0	5.7%	0	17.1%	0	0	2.9%	0	0	0	8.6%	37.1%	0	0		Kivisild2003
Madhya Pradesh Brahmins (Madhya Pradesh, India)	IE	42	0	0	2.38%	0	7.14%	0	23.81%	0	7.14%	2.38%	0	2.38%	4.76%	0	0	38.1%	0	0	0		Sharma2009
Madhya Pradesh Gonds (Madhya Pradesh, India)	Dr (Gondi)	64	0	0	0	0	62.5%	0	0	6.25%	0	0	6.25%	0	6.25%	0	0	18.75%	0	0	0		Sharma2009
Madhya Pradesh Saharia (Madhya Pradesh, India)	IE	57	0	0	5.27%	0	33.33%	0	0	3.51%	0	0	0	0	1.75%	0	0	50.87%	0	5.3%	0		Sharma2009
Maharashtra Brahmins (Maharashtra, India)	IE (Marathi)	30	3.33%	0	0	3.33%	10%	0	16.67%	3.33%	10%	3.33%	3.33%	0	0	0	0	43.33%	0	3.33%	0		Sharma2009
Manipuri (Bangladesh)	ST (Meitei)	102	0	0	0	5.56%	2.22%	10.00%	11.11%	0	25.56%	1.11%	0	0	15.56%	0	0	11.11%	0	0	0		Hasan2019
Mappila Muslims (Kerala, India)	Dr (Malayalam)	40	0	0	0	0	27.5%	0	20%	5%	10%	0	0	0	0	0	0	32.5%	0	5%	0		Eaaswarkhanth2009
Mundari (East India)	AA (Munda)	789	0	0	3.3%	0	25.4%	0	4.4%	0	0	0	55%	1.5%	0	0	0	0	0	4.9%	0		Kumar2007
New Delhi Hindus (New Delhi, India)	IE	49	0	0	0	2%	18.3%	0	8.1%	0	4.1%	0	2%	0	6.1%	0	0	34.7%	0	20.4%	0		Fornarino2009
Pakistan	IE (Indo-Aryan, Iranian), Dr (Brahui, Burushaski	176	7.4%	0	0	6.2%	6.2%	0	15.3%	0	13.1%	0	2.3%	0	3.4%	0	0	24.4%	7.4%	7.4%	0		Sengupta2006
Pakistan	IE (Indo-Aryan, Iranian), Dr (Brahui); Burushaski	638	3%	0	0.8%	2.7%	2.5%	0	20.2%	0	11.6%	0	0.5%	0	2.2%	0	0	37.1%	0	7.8%	0		Firasat2006
Parsis (Western India – Lay)	IE (Gujarati)	122	0	5.7%	0	0	0	0	54.9%	1.6%	2.5%	0	0	23.8%	0	0	0	5.7%	0	0	0	BT=5.7%	López2017
Parsis (Western India – Priest)	IE (Gujarati)	71	0	1.4%	0	0	0	0	4.2%	0	54.9%	0	0	31.0%	0	0	0	0	0	0	0	BT=8.5%	López2017
Pashtun (Khyber Pakhtunkhwa, Pakistan)	IE (Pashto)	96	0	0	2.1%	11.5%	4.2%	0	6.2%	0	12.5%	0	5.2%	0	5.2%	0	0	44.8%	0	0	1%		Firasat2006
Pathan (Khyber Pakhtunkhwa, Pakistan)	IE (Pashto)	21	4.8%	0	0	9.5%	14.3%	0	0	0	9.5%	0	0	0	9.5%	4.8%	0	38.1%	9.5%	9.5%	0		Sengupta2006
Punjab Brahmin (Punjab, India)	IE (Punjabi)	28	3.58%	0	3.57%	3.57%	0	0	21.43%	0	7.14%	0	0	0	0	0	0	35.71%	0	25%	0		Sharma2009
Punjabi (Punjab, India)	IE (Punjabi)	66	3%	0	0	0	4.6%	0	21.2%	0	12.1%	0	0	0	0	0	0	47%	7.6%	4.6%	0		Kivisild2003
Punjabis (Punjab, Pakistan)	IE (Punjabi)	48	2.08%	0	0	8.33%	6.25%	0	27.08%	0	4.17%	0	0	0	4.17%	0	0	35.42%	0	12.5%	0		Poznik2016
Rajastanis (Rajasthan, India)	IE (Rajasthani)	202	0	1%	0	3%	9%	1%	10%	0	8%	0	3%	0	10%	0	0	43%	0	15%	0		Kumawat2020
Rajput (Uttar Pradesh, India)	IE	29	3.4%	0	3.4%	0	20.7%	0	17.2%	0	6.9%	0	3.4%	0	0	0	0	31%	0	13.8%	0		Sengupta2006
Rakhine (Bangladesh)	ST (Arakanese)	107	0	0	0	1.87%	6.54%	1.87%	13.08%	0	29.91%	3.74%	0	0	28.04%	0	0	10.28%	0	0	0		Hasan2019
Shia (Uttar Pradesh, India)	IE (Urdu)	154	9.1%	11%	3.3%	9.7%	7.8%	0	19.5%	3.3%	3.9%	0	2%	2%	0	0	0	15.6%	0	13%	0		Zhao2009
Sindhi (Sindh, Pakistan)	IE (Sindhi)	21	0	0	0	0	0	0	33.3%	0	4.8%	0	0	0	4.8%	0	0	52.4%	0	4.8%	0		Sengupta2006
Sinhalese (Sri Lanka)	IE (Sinhala)	39	0	0	10.3%	0	10.3%	0	10.3%	0	18%	0	0	0	0	0	0	12.8%	0	38.5%	0		Kivisild2003
Sri Lanka	IE (Sinhala)	74	0	0	9%	0	15%	0	14%	1%	19%	0	0	3%	0	0	0	27%	0	12%	0		Mustak2019
Sourashtrians (Brahmin) (Tamil Nadu, India)	IE (Gujarati), Dr (Tamil)	46	6.5%	0	4.4%	0	15.2%	0	2.2%	0	26.1%	0	2.2%	0	0	0	0	39.1%	0	4.3%	0		Cordaux2004
South Indian Tribals (South India)	Dr (Dravidian), AA (Austroasiatic)	315	8.6%	0	18.1%	0	31.1%	0	2.9%	0	7%	0	6.7%	6%	0	0	0	8.9%	0	4.4%	0	DE=0.6%	Cordaux2004
South castes (South India)	Dr (Dravidian)	447	5.1%	0	11.9%	0	14.1%	0	9.8%	5.6%	21.9%	0	1.6%	1.9%	0	0	0	13.6%	0	10.6%	0		Cordaux2004
Sri Lanka	IE (Sinhala), Dr (Tamil)	91	3.3%	0	9.9%	5.5%	25.3%	0	19.8%	0	15.4%	0	1.1%	3.3%	0	0	0	13.2%	0	0	0		Karafet2005
Sri Lankan Tamils (UK)	Dr (Tamil)	55	1.8%	0	0	0	29.1%	0	14.5%	0	18.2%	0	0	0	3.6%	0	0	27.3%	0	5.5%	0		Poznik2016
Sunni (Uttar Pradesh, India)	IE (Urdu)	104	7.7%	0	2%	5.8%	10.6%	0	15.4%	2%	3.8%	0	2.9%	2%	0	0	0	28.8%	0	19.2%	0		Zhao2009
Tamil Nadu (India)	Dr (Tamil)	1680	4.4%	0.3%	16.3%	3.1%	23.6%	0	2.1%	14.0%	2.0%	0	0.4%	1.5%	2.0%	12.7%	0	8.2%	0	0.8%	0		ArunKumar 2012
Terai Hindus (Terai, Nepal)	IE (Nepali)	26	11.5%	0	0	0	3.8%	0	3.8%	0	0	0	3.8%	0	0	0	0	69.2%	0	3.8%	0		Fornarino2009
Tharu (Nepal)	IE (Tharu)	171	0.6%	0	0	0	25.7%	0	14%	0	2.3%	0	36.8%	0	1.2%	0	0	8.8%	0	4.7%	0		Fornarino2009
Tripuri (Bangladesh)	ST (Kokborok)	107	0	9.41%	0	1.18%	3.53%	3.53%	10.59%	0	65.88%	0	0	0	4.71%	0	0	0	0	0	0		Hasan2019
Uttar Pradesh (South) Kols (Uttar Pradesh, India)	AA (Kolarian)	54	0	0	0	0	11.11%	0	33.34%	0	0	0	40.74%	0	0	0	0	14.81%	0	0	0		Sharma2009
Uttar Pradesh (South) Gonds (Uttar Pradesh, India)	Dr (Gondi)	37	0	0	0	0	59.46%	0	18.92%	10.81%	0	2.7%	8.11%	0	0	0	0	0	0	0	0		Sharma2009
Uttar Pradesh Brahmin (Uttar Pradesh, India)	IE	31	0	0	0	0	16.13%	0	3.23%	0	3.21%	0	0	0	6.46%	0	0	67.74%	0	3.23%	0		Sharma2009
West Bengal Brahmins (West Bengal, India)	IE (Bengali)	18	0	0	0	0	5.56%	0	0	0	0	0	0	0	0	0	0	72.22%	0	22.22%	0		Sharma2009

== Chronological development of haplogroups ==
Haplogroup	Possible time of origin	Possible place of origin	Possible TMRCA
A00	235,900 or 275,000 years ago	Africa	37,600 years ago
CT	88,000 or 101-100,000 years ago	Africa	68,500 years ago
C	65,900 or 50,000-70,000 years ago	Indian subcontinent (part of first migration out of Africa to Southeast Asia through Coastal India)	48,800 years ago
E	65,200, 69,000, or 73,000 years ago	Northeast Africa or Middle East (part of second migration out of Africa, initially settled in the Middle East)	52,300 years ago
F	65,900 years ago	Northeast Africa or Middle East (its descendants are present in nearly 90% of all non-African populations)	48,800 years ago
GHIJK	49,000 – 59,000 years ago	Indian subcontinent or Southeast Asia	48,500 years ago
HIJK	48,500 - 59,000 years ago	Eurasia	48,500 years ago
G	more than 48,500 years ago	Middle East	25,200 years ago
K	47,200 years ago	Iran or South Central Asia	45,400 years ago
H	45,400 years ago	Middle East or South Central Asia, known as "Indian Marker"	45,600 years ago
P	45,400 years ago	South Central Asia, North of Hindu Kush mountains	41,500 years ago
J	42,900 years ago	Mesopotamia in northern Fertile Crescent region of the Middle East	31,600 years ago
I	42,900 years ago	Europe, Near East, Central Asia, known as the "European Haplogroup"	27,500 years ago
L	42,600 years ago	Eastern Iranian plateau in the Middle East or Pamir Mountains of Tajikistan in South-Central Asia	23,100 years ago
T	42,600 years ago	Northeast Africa, Middle East, Europe,	26,900 years ago
O	41,750 or 36,800 years ago	Central or East Asia	30,500 years ago
N	36,800 years ago	North Eurasia or East Asia	22,000 years ago
R	31,900 years ago	Central Asia (from Caspian sea to border of Western China) or Siberia	28,200 years ago
Q	31,700 years ago	Southern Siberia (adjacent to the border between Central Asia and North Asia)	28,700 years ago
J-M172 (J2)	31,600 years ago	Iranian plateau in Middle East	27,600 years ago
R-M173 (R1)	28,200 years ago	Central Asia	22,800 years ago
R-M479 (R2)	28,200 years ago	Indian subcontinent or South Central Asia	16,300 years ago
R-M420 (R1a)	22,800 years ago	Eurasia	18,200 years ago
R-M17 (R1a1)	13,000 or 18,000 years ago	Eurasian Steppe or Indian subcontinent	
R-M343 (R1b)	22,800 years ago	Eurasia	20,400 years ago

== See also ==
- South Asia
  - Demographics of South Asia
  - Genetics and archaeogenetics of South Asia
  - Languages of South Asia
  - MtDNA haplogroups in populations of South Asia
  - South Asian ethnic groups
- Y-DNA haplogroups by population
  - Y-DNA haplogroups in populations of the Near East
  - Y-DNA haplogroups in populations of the Caucasus
  - Y-DNA haplogroups in populations of Central and North Asia
  - Y-DNA haplogroups in populations of East and Southeast Asia
  - Y-DNA haplogroups in populations of Europe
  - Y-DNA haplogroups in populations of North Africa
  - Y-DNA haplogroups in populations of Sub-Saharan Africa
  - Y-DNA haplogroups in populations of Oceania
  - Y-DNA haplogroups in indigenous peoples of the Americas
