= Y-DNA haplogroups in populations of Europe =

Y-DNA haplogroups in populations of Europe are haplogroups of the male Y-chromosome found in European populations.

== Frequencies in European ethnic groups ==
The table below shows the human Y-chromosome DNA haplogroups, based on relevant studies, for various ethnic and other notable groups from Europe. The samples are taken from individuals identified with the ethnic and linguistic designations shown in the first two columns; the third column gives the sample size studied; and the other columns give the percentage for each particular haplogroup (ethnic groups from the North Caucasus, although technically located in Europe, are considered in their own article where they are placed alongside populations of the South Caucasus for the purpose of conserving space).

Note: The converted frequency of Haplogroup 2, including modern haplogroups I, G and sometimes J from some old studies conducted before 2004 may lead to unsubstantial frequencies below.

Population	Language	n	R1b	R1a	I	E1b1b	J	G	N	T	Others	Reference
Albanians	IE (Albanian)	51	17.6%	9.8%	19.6%	21.57%	23.53%	2.0%	0.0	0.0		Semino2000
Albanians (Pristina)	IE (Albanian)	114	21.10%	4.42%	7.96%	47.40%	16.7%	0%	0%	0%	1.77%	Pericic2005
Albanians (Tirana)	IE (Albanian)	30	13.3%	13.3%	16.7%	23.3%	20.0%	3.3%				Bosch2006
Albanians (Tirana)	IE (Albanian)	55	18.2%	9.1%	21.8%	25.4%	23.5%	1.8%	0.0	0.0		Battaglia2008
Albanians (North Macedonia)	IE (Albanian)	64	18.8%	1.6%	17.2%	39.1%	22%	1.6%	0.0	0.0		Battaglia2008
Albanians (Tirana and North Macedonia)	IE (Albanian)	119	18.50%	5.05%	19.33%	32.8%	22.70%	1.7%	0.0	0.0		Battaglia2008
Albanians	IE (Albanian)	223	18.39%	4.04%	13%	35.43%	23.77%	2.69%	0	0.9%	1.79%	Sarno2015
Arkhangelsk (Russia)	IE (Slavic), Uralic	28	0	17.9%	50.0%	3.6%	0	0%	28.6%	0	0	Mirabal2009
Andalusians	IE (Italic)	29	65.52%	0.0				0.0	0.0	6.9%	L=3.4	Semino2000
Andalusians	IE (Italic)	103			3.9%							Rootsi2004
Andalusians	IE (Italic)	76				9.2%	1.1%					Semino2004
Armenians	IE (Armenian)	413	29.06%	1.7%	3.63%	5.09%	36.07%	9.44%	0.24%	8.48%	Q=0.24% 1/413	Herrara2012
Aromanians (Dukasi, Albania)	IE (Italic)	39	2.56%	2.56%	17.95%	17.95%	48.72%	10.26%	0.0	0.0		Bosch2006
Aromanians (Andon Poci, Albania)	IE (Italic)	19	36.84%	0.0	42.11%	15.79%	5.26%	0.0	0.0	0.0		Bosch2006
Aromuns (Kruševo, Macedonia)	IE (Italic)	43	27.91%	11.63%	20.93%	20.93%	11.63%	6.98%	0.0	0.0		Bosch2006
Aromanians (Štip, Macedonia)	IE (Italic)	65	23.08%	21.54%	16.92%	18.46%	20.0	0.0	0.0	0.0		Bosch2006
Aromanians (Romania)	IE (Italic)	42	23.81%	2.38%	19.05%	7.14%	33.33%	0.0%				Bosch2006
Aromanians Balkan)	IE (Italic)	208 (Note: Total Aromuns: 39 + 19 + 43 + 65 + 42 =208)	21.63%	10.1%	20.67%	16.35%	25%	3.37%	0.0	0.0		Bosch2006
Ashkenazi Jews	Afro-Asiatic (Semitic)	79		12.7%		22.8%	43.04%					Nebel2001
Ashkenazi Jews	Afro-Asiatic (Semitic)	442			4.1	19.7	38.01%	9.7%	0.2%			Behar2004
Austrians	IE (Germanic, West)	1,017	44%	10.8%	21.5%	8.6%	10.9%	9%				
Bashkirs (Perm)	Turkic	43	86.05%	9.3%	0.0	0.0	0.0	2.33%	2.33%	0.0		Lobov
Basque	Basque (Basque)	67	88.06	0.0	7.46%	2.2%	1.0%	0.0	0.0	0.0		Semino2000
Basque	Basque (Basque)	109	92.66%			0.92%	3.67%			0.92%		Adams2008
Bavarians	IE (Germanic, West)	80	50.0%	15.0%		8.0%	5.0%		0.0	0.0		Rosser2000
Belgians	IE (Germanic/Italic)	92	63.04%	4.0%		2.0%						Rosser2000
Belarusians	IE (Slavic, East)	41	0.0	39.0%		10.0%			2.4%			Rosser2000
Belarusians	IE (Slavic, East)	147			19.0%							Rootsi2004
Belarusians	IE (Slavic, East)	68	4.4%	45.6%	25.0%	4.4%		1.5%	8.8%			Kharkov2005
Belarusians	IE (Slavic, East)	306	4.2%	51.0%		4.6%	3.3%		9.5%			Behar2003
Bearnais	IE (Italic)	26			7.7%		3.8%					Semino2004
Bearnais	IE (Italic)	43				3.7%						Rootsi2004
Bosnians (Zenica)	IE (Slavic, South)	69	1.4%	24.6%	53.65% (Note: I in Bosnians (Zenica): I1a= 1.45%, 1/69. I1b*(xM26)= 52.20%, 36/69)	10.14%	0.0	4.35%				Pericic2005
Bosniaks	IE (Slavic, South)	85	4%	15%	49%	13%	12%	4%	4%			Marjanovcic2006
British	IE (Germanic, West)	32	68.75%	9.38%								Helgason2000
Bulgarians	IE (Slavic, South)	127	11.0%	17.3%	27.5%	19.7%	18.1%	1.6%		0.8%		Karachanak2009
Bulgarians	IE (Slavic, South)	808	10.7%	17.5%	26.6%	22.1%	13.9%	4.8%	0.5%	1.6%	C=0.5; H=0.6; L=0.2; Q=0.4; R2a=0.1	Karachanak2013
Bulgarians	IE (Slavic, South)	100	14.0%	16.0%	34.0%	21.0%	9.0%	2.0%	1.0%	2.0%	H=1.0%	Begoña Martinez-Cruz2012
Bulgarians (Pomaks)	IE (Slavic, South)	17	23%	-	53%	18%	6%	-	-	-		Family Tree DNA - Bulgarian DNA Project.
Catalans	IE (Italic)	24	79.2%	0.0%	4.2%	4.2%	4.2%	8.0%				Rootsi2004
Catalans	IE (Italic)	33				6.1%	3.6%					Semino2004
Cantabrians (Pasiegos)	IE (Italic)	56				42.9%						Cruciani2004
Chuvashes	Turkic	79	3.8%	31.6%	11.3%	0	24.2%	0	27.8%	0		Tambets2004
Croats (Bosnia)	IE (Slavic, South)	90	2.22%	12.22%	73.33%	8.90%	2.22%	1.11%				Battaglia2008
Croats (Osijek)	IE (Slavic, South)	29		37.93%	27.59%	10.35%	10.35%	13.79%				Battaglia2008
Croats (Bosnia), +(Osijek)	IE (Slavic, South)	119	1.68%	18.49%	62.19%	9.24%	4.2%	4.2%				Battaglia2008
Croats (Split)	IE (Slavic, South)			26%								Underhill 2009
Croats (Zabok, Zagreb, Delnice, Donji Miholjac, Pazin)	IE (Slavic, South)	88	16%	33%	39%	7%	2%	1%				Sarac2016
Croats (Dubrovnik)	IE (Slavic, South)	179	5%	13%	63%	6%	7%	2%		2%		Sarac2016
Croats (Zadar)	IE (Slavic, South)	25	0	4%	72%	8%	12%			4%		Sarac2016
Croats (Žumberak)	IE (Slavic, South)	44	11%	34%	27%	18%	5%	5%				Sarac2016
Croats	IE (Slavic, South)	336	8.33%	20.24%	52.98%	8.04%	5.96%	1.79%		1.49%		Sarac2016
Croats	IE (Slavic, South)	1100	7.91%	22.1%	44%	10.73%	7.37%	2.73%	0.64%	0.64%	H=1.82% Q=0.73%	Mrsic2011
Croats (Central proper)	IE (Slavic, South)	220	31.82%	23.64%	39.09%	11.82%	8.64%	3.64%				Mrsic2011
Croats (North of north proper)	IE (Slavic, South)	220		29%	32%							Mrsic2011
Croats (Slavonia)	IE (Slavic, South)	220		19%	46%							Mrsic2011
Croats (Dalmatia)	IE (Slavic, South)	220		19%	60%							Mrsic2011
Croats (Istria and south proper)	IE (Slavic, South)	220		20%	46%							Mrsic2011
Croats	IE (Slavic, South)	1555	7.52%	21.41%	47.33%	10.03%	6.82%	2.63%	0.45%	0.45%	H 1.29% 20/1555 Q 0.51% 8/1555	Battaglia2008; Sarac2016; Mrsic2011
Croats (mainland)	IE (Slavic, South)	189			38.1%							Rootsi2004
Czechs	IE (Slavic, West)	257		34.2%	18.3%	5.8%	4.7%	5.1%	1.6%			Luca2007
Czechs and Slovaks	IE (Slavic, West)	45	35.6%	26.7%		2.2%						Semino2000
Czechs and Slovaks	IE (Slavic, West)	198			13.6%							Rootsi2004
Danes	IE (Germanic, North)	12	31.67%	16.67%	43.33%							Helgason2000
Danes	IE (Germanic, North)	194			38.7%							Rootsi2004
Danes	IE (Germanic, North)	35				2.9%						Cruciani2004
Dutch	IE (Germanic, West)	410	50.2%	3.3%	32.9%	2.9%	5.1%	4.1%	0.2%			Barjesteh2008
Dutch	IE (Germanic, West)	2085	57.9%	4.0%	27.8%	2.6%	3.5%	2.7	0.05%	0.7%	A=0.1, H=0.2, L=0.05, O=0.1, Q=0.3	Altena2020
English (Central)	IE (Germanic, West)	215	61.9%	5%	25%							Weale2002
English	IE (Germanic, West)	1830	57%	4%	25%	3%	4%	5%				FTDNA 2016
Estonians	Uralic (Finnic)	207	9.0%			3.0%	1.0%		40.6%			Rosser2000
Estonians	Uralic (Finnic)	118		37.3%								Laitinen2002
Estonians	Uralic (Finnic)	210			18.6%							Rootsi2004
Finns	Uralic (Finnic)	57	2.0%	10.5%		2.0%			63.2%			Rosser2000
Finns	Uralic (Finnic)	38	0.0	7.9%	28.9				63.2%			
French	IE (Italic)	23	52.2%	0	17.4%	8.7%	4.3%	0	0	0		Semino2000
French	IE (Italic)	40				8.0%						Rosser2000
Frisians	IE (Germanic, West)	94	56.0%	7.0%	29.0%	2.0%	6.0%					Wilson2001
Frisians	IE (Germanic, West)	94	55.3%	7.4%	34.0%	2.1%	1.4%					Weale2002
Gagauz (Kongaz)	Turkic	48	10.4%	12.5%	31.3%	16.7%	8.3%	10.4%	4.2%	6.3%		Varzari2006
Gagauz (Etulia)	Turkic	41	14.6%	26.8%	24.4%	9.8%	7.3%	17.1%	0.0	0.0		Varzari2006
Germans	IE (Germanic, West)	48	47.9%	8.1%	22%							Helgason2000
Germans	IE (Germanic, West)	16	50%	16%	22%	6.2%	0	0	0	0		Semino2000
Germans	IE (Germanic, West)	1215	38.9%	17.9%	23.6%	6.2%	4.0%		1.6%		7.7	Kayser2005
Germans	IE (Germanic, West)	3,000+	44%	12%	20%	5%	6%	5%	1%			Gabel 2013
Greeks	IE (Greek)	77	11.7%	15.6%	19.5%	20.8%	16.9%	9.1%	0.0%	0.0%	F=1.3% H2=1.3% K=1.3% K2=2.6%	Firasat2007
Greeks	IE (Greek)	118	22.8%	8.3%								Helgason2000
Greeks (continental)	IE (Greek)	154	13%	12%	18%	24%	20%	5%			8%	Di Giacommo 2003
Greeks (Agrinio)	IE (Greek)	21	19.05%	4.76%	23.81%	9.52%	28.57%	4.76%			9.52%	Di Giacommo 2003
Greeks (Ioannina)	IE (Greek)	24	16.67%	8.33%	8.33%	29.17%	20.84%	4.17%			12.5%	Di Giacommo 2003
Greeks (Patrai)	IE (Greek)	18	11.11%	5.56%	11.11%	44.44%	16.67%	0.0%			11.11%	Di Giacommo 2003
Greeks (Kardhitsa)	IE (Greek)	25	8%	20%	12%	28%	16%	12%			4%	Di Giacommo 2003
Greeks (Serrai)	IE (Greek)	25	12%	8%	36%	24%	16%	4%				Di Giacommo 2003
Greeks (Thessaloniki)	IE (Greek)	20	5%	25%	20%	20%	15%	5%			10%	Di Giacommo 2003
Greeks (Larissa)	IE (Greek)	21	19.05%	9.52%	14.29%	14.29%	28.57%	4.76%			9.52%	Di Giacommo 2003
Greeks (Heraklion)	IE (Greek)	42	7.14%		14.29%	26.19%	40.48%	9.52%			2.38%	Di Giacommo 2003
Greeks (continental, Agrinio, Ioannina, Patrai, Kardhitsa, Serrai, Thessaloniki, Larissa, Heraklion)	IE (Greek)	350	12.29%	10.29%	17.71	24.29%	22.57%	5.71%			7.14%	Di Giacommo 2003
Greeks (Nikomedeia, Lerna/Franchthi, Sesklo/Dimini)	IE (Greek)	171	13.45% 23/171	11.11% 19/171	15.79% 27/171	31.58% 54/171	19.88% 34/171	4.68% 8/171		1.75; 3/171		King2008
Greeks (Crete)	IE (Greek)	193	17.1% 33/193	8.81% 17/193	12.95% 25/193	8.81% 17/193	38.86% 75/193	10.88% 21/193		2.07% 4/193		King2008
Greeks (Nikomedeia, Lerna/Franchthi, Sesklo/Dimini),+(Crete)	IE (Greek)	364	15.38% 56/364	9.89%% 36/364	14.29% 52/364	19.51% 71/364	29.95% 109/364	7.97% 29/364		1.92% 7/364		King2008
Greeks (Peloponnese)	IE (Greek)	36				47.42% 17/36	13.89%					Semino2004
Greeks (Thrace)	IE (Greek)	41	12.2%	22.0%	19.5%	19.5%	19.5%	4.9%				Bosch2006
Greeks (North)	IE (Greek)	96	14.6% 14/96	18.8% 18/96	12.5% 12/96	35.4% 34/96		5.2% 5/96		2.1% 2/96	L=1% 1/96	Zalloua2008
Greeks (South)	IE (Greek)	46	19.6% 9/46	2.2% 1/46	23.9% 11/46	43.5% 20/46		6.5% 3/46		2.2% 1/46		Zalloua2008
Greeks (North)+(South)	IE (Greek)	142	16.2%	13.38%	16.2%	38.03%		5.63%		2.11%	L=0.70% 1/142	Zalloua2008
Greeks (Euboea)	IE (Greek)	96	9%	10%	11%	20%	28%	9%				
Greeks (Corinthia)	IE (Greek)	110	9%	17%	16%	27%	22%	3%				
Greeks (Macedonia)	IE (Greek)	57	14.0%	12.8%	29.8%	22.9%	15.9%	1.8%		1.8%		Battaglia 2008
Greeks (Athens)	IE (Greek)	92	20%	16%	10%	22%	23%	3%		4%	C=1, L=1	Battaglia 2008
Greeks (Athens)	IE (Greek)	132	15%	6%		27%					IJ+G=49%, K*=4%	Waelle 2001
Greeks (Cyprus)	IE (Greek)	629	11.13%	4%	4%	23%	41%	13%		3%	L=2%, H=1%	Voskarides 2016
Gypsy/Muslim Roma (Macedonia)	IE (Indic)	57	1.8%	1.8%	5.3%	29.8%		1.8%			H=59.6	Pericic2005
Herzegovinians (Siroki Brijeg, Mostar)	IE (Slavic, South)	141	3.55%	12.06%	70.92%	8.51%	1.42%					Pericic2005
Hungarians (Hungary)	Uralic (Ugric)	215	18.1%	25.6%	31.37%	6.1%	10.23%	4.2%	0.47%	0.0%	H=5.12% R2=0.47% R1*=1.40%	Völgyi2008
Hungarians (Paloc)	Uralic (Ugric)	45	13.3%	60.0%	11.1%	8.9%	2.2%	2.2%	0.0%	0.0%	L=2.2%	Semino2000
Hungarians (Romania)	Uralic (Ugric)	97	20%	19%	22%	9%	21%	5%	1%			
Hungarians (Great Hungarian Plain)	Uralic (Ugric)	100	15%	30%	24%	10%	16%	3%				
Icelanders	IE (Germanic, North)	181	41.44%	23.76%	34.25%							Helgason2000
Irish	IE (Celtic)	222	81.53%	0.45%	14.86%							Helgason2000
Irish	IE (Celtic)	257				2.0%						Rosser2000
Italians	IE (Italic)	50	62.0%		8.0%			10.0%				Rootsi2004
Italians	IE (Italic)			2.7%		13.0%						
Italians (Calabria)	IE (Italic)		32.4%		5.4%	23%	24.6%					
Italians (Apulia)	IE (Italic)				2.6%	13.9%	31.45%					
Italians	IE (Italic)	884	39%	3%	11%	14%	18%	12%		2%	L=2%	Boattini2013
Italians (Sicily)	IE (Italic)				8.8%	27.3%	23.8%					Semino2004
Italians (South)	IE (Italic)	68	25.00%	2.94%	5.88%	25.88%		14.71%		2.94%		Zalloua2008
Italians (East Sicily)	IE (Italic)	87	19.54%	2.3%	4.6%	29.19%		4.6%		4.6%		Zalloua2008
Italians (West Sicily)	IE (Italic)	125	27.2%	2.4%	11.2%	19.2%		12.8%		3.2%		Zalloua2008
Italians (South)	IE (Italic)	280	24.29%	2.5%	7.86%	23.93%		10.71%		3.57%		Zalloua2008
Komi	Uralic (Finnic)	94	16.0	33.0	5.3				35.1			
Komi (Izhemsky)	Uralic (Finnic)	54	0.0	29.6	1.9	0.0	0.0	0.0	68.5	0.0		Mirabal2009
Komi (Priluzsky)	Uralic (Finnic)	49	2.0	32.7	4.1	0.0	0.0	0.0	61.2	0.0		Mirabal2009
Latvians	IE (Baltic)	114		39.5%		0.9%			42.1%			Laitinen2002
Lithuanians	IE (Baltic)	38	5.0%									
Lithuanians	IE (Baltic)	114		36.0%		0.9%			43.0%			Laitinen2002
ethnic Macedonians	IE (Slavic, South)	211	11.4%	14.2%	31.3%	18%	16%	3.8%	0.5%	1.9%	L=0.5	Noveski2010
ethnic Macedonians (Skopje)	IE (Slavic, South)	79	5.1%	15.2%	34.2%	24.1%	12.7%	5.1%				Pericic2005
Macedonians (Skopje)	IE (Slavic, South)	52	13.5	13.5	28.8	23.1	11.5	3.8				Bosch2006
Maltese	Afro-Asiatic (Semitic)	187	22.0	5.0	9.0	6.0		9.0		0.0		Zalloua2008
Mari	Uralic (Finnic)	111	2.7	47.7	8.1				41.4			
Mari	Uralic (Finnic)	48	10.4	29.2		0.0	6.3		50.0			Rosser2000
Moldovans	IE (Italic)	70	6	35		10					I+G=37	Stefan2001
Moldavians (Carahasani)	IE (Italic)	72	16.7	34.7	25.0	12.5	9.7	0.0	1.4	0.0		Varzari2006
Moldavians (Sofia)	IE (Italic)	54	16.7%	20.4%	35.2%	13.0%	5.6%	1.9%	3.7%	1.9%		Varzari2006
Mordvins (Erzya)	Uralic (Finnic)	46		39.1%								Malaspina2003
Mordvins (Moksha)	Uralic (Finnic)	46		21.7%								Malaspina2003
Mordvins	Uralic (Finnic)	83	13.3	26.5	19.3				19.3			
Norwegians	IE (Germanic, North)	906	24	25	42	1	1	1	2		Q=3	FTDNA
Orcadians	IE (Germanic, West)	71	66.0	19.7								Wilson2001
Poles	IE (Slavic, West)		16.4	56.4	17.8	4.0	1.0					
Poles	IE (Slavic, West)	93	13.4	55.9	16.1				3.2			
Poles	IE (Slavic, West)	913	11.6	57.0	17.3	4.5	2.5		3.7		3.3	Kayser2005
Pomors (Mezen)	IE (Slavic, East)	54	0	44.4	0	0	0	0	53.7	0	F*=1.9	Balanovsky2008
Portuguese	IE (Italic)	303			5.3							Rootsi2004
Portuguese (South)	IE (Italic)	57	56.0%	2.0%		17.0%						Rosser2000
Portuguese (North)	IE (Italic)	328	62.0	0		11.0						Rosser2000
Romanians (Buhusi, Piatra Neamț)	IE (Italic)	54	13.0	20.4	48.1	7.4	5.6	5.6	0.0	0.0		Varzari2006
Romanians	IE (Italic)	361			22.2							Rootsi2004
Romanians (Constanţa)	IE (Italic)	31	16.1	9.7	41.9	9.7	6.5	12.9	0.0	0.0		Bosch2006
Romanians (Ploieşti)	IE (Italic)	36	8.3	5.6	38.9	16.7	19.4	8.3	0.0	0.0		Bosch2006
Romanians	IE (Italic)	179	10.1	20.1	27.9	19.6	18.4	2.2	0.6	0.6	Q=0.6	Martinez-Cruz 2012
Russians	IE (Slavic, East)	122	6.6	46.7		6.6	4.1		18.0			Rosser2000
Russians	IE (Slavic, East)	61	21.3	42.6	13.1				16.4			
Russians (Oryol region)	IE (Slavic, East)	110	3.6	62.7	22.7	0.9	0.0	0.9	0.0	5.4	0	Balanovsky2008
Russians (Voronezh region)	IE (Slavic, East)	96	5.2	59.4	20.8	1.0	0.0	3.1	2.1	6.3	0	Balanovsky2008
Russians (Tver region)	IE (Slavic, East)	73	6.8	56.2	15.0	4.1	0.0	4.1	0.0	11.0	0	Balanovsky2008
Russians (Novgorod region)	IE (Slavic, East)	38	8.1	54.1	10.8						0	Malyarchuk2008
Russians (Southern)	IE (Slavic, East)	484	4.8	56.9	21.0	1.8	0.0	3.5	1.0	10.0	0	Balanovsky2008
Russians (Belgorod region)	IE (Slavic, East)	143	2.8	59.4	16.7							Balanovsky
Russians (Kursk)	IE (Slavic, East)	40	7.5	52.5	15.0	10.0	2.5	0	12.5	0	0	Mirabal2009
Russians (Pinega, Mezen, Krasnoborsk)	IE (Slavic, East)	380	6.1%	33.4%	14.5%	0.3%	1.8%	1.3%	41.3%	0.0%		Balanovsky2008
Russians (Central)	IE (Slavic, East)	364	7.7%	47.0%	16.5%	5.2%	3.3%	0.0	17.0%	0.8%		Balanovsky2008
Russians (Adygea)	IE (Slavic, East)	78			24.4							Rootsi2004
Russians (Bashkortostan)	IE (Slavic, East)	50			6.0							Rootsi2004
Russians (Cossacks)	IE (Slavic, East)	97			22.7							Rootsi2004
Russians (Kostroma region)	IE (Slavic, East)	53			18.9							Rootsi2004
Russians (Pinega)	IE (Slavic, East)	127			4.7							Rootsi2004
Russians (Smolensk region)	IE (Slavic, East)	120			10.8							Rootsi2004
Ruthenians (Vojvodina)	IE (Slavic)			44%								
Sami (Sweden)	Uralic (Finnic)	38	7.9%	15.8%	31.6%	0.0	0.0	0.0	44.7%	0.0		Karlsson2006
Sami	Uralic (Finnic)	127	3.9	11.0					47.2			
Sami	Uralic (Finnic)				31.4							Rootsi2004
Sardinians (Sardinia, Italy)	IE (Italic)		22.1		42.3	5.0	12.5					
Sardinians (Northern Sardinia)	IE (Italic)	86	20.0	0.0	28.0	13.0		21.0		0.0		Zalloua2008
Sardinians (Southern Sardinia)	IE (Italic)	187	19.0	1.0	35.0	11.0		14.0		0.0		Zalloua2008
Scots	IE (Germanic, West)	750	72.53%	8.53%	14%							
Sephardic Jews	IE (Italic)	78	29.5%	3.9%	11.5%	19.2%	28.2%					Nebel2001
Serbs and South Slavs	IE (Slavic, South)	1092	5%	20%	43%	14%	11%	4%	3%	-	Q=1%	Serb DNA Project 2016
Serbs	IE (Slavic, South)	267	3%	26%	39%	15%	9%	5%	2%		—	Serb DNA Project 2014
Serbs	IE (Slavic, South)	179	4.5%	14.5%	38.5%	17.3%	5.6%	2.2%	3.3%		H=2.2, Q=1.7, L=0.6	Mirabal, V. 2010
Serbs (Vojvodina)	IE (Slavic, South)	185	10.3%	15.1%	35.1%	16.2%	11.4%		3.2%		H=2.7 Q=1.1 others=4.9	Veselinovic 2008
Serbs (Belgrade)	IE (Slavic, South)	113	10.6%	15.9%	36.3%	21.2%	8%					Pericic2005
Serbs (Aleksandrovac, Serbia)	IE (Slavic, South)	85	1.17%	21.1%	41.1%	15.2%	9.40%	10.5%	0.0%	0.0%		Todorovic2013
Serbs	IE (Slavic, South)	103	7.8%	20.4%	37.9%	18.4%	7.8%	5.8%	1.9%			Regueiro2012
Serbs (Bosnia)	IE (Slavic, South)	81	6.2%	13.6%	40.7%	22.2%	9.9%	1.2%	6.2%	0.0%		Battaglia2008
Slovaks (Vojvodina)	IE (Slavic, West)			42%								
Slovaks	IE (Slavic, West)	250	13.2%	38%	27.6%	7.2%	3.6%	4%	2.4%	0.4%		Sotak
Slovenians	IE (Slavic, South)	75	21.3%	38.7%	30.7%	2.7%	4.0%	2.7%	0.0%	0.0%		Battaglia2008
Slovenian	IE (Slavic, South)	70		37.1%		7.1%	5.7%		0.0%	0.0%		Rosser2000
Slovenian	IE (Slavic, South)	55			38.2%							Rootsi2004
Spanish	IE (Italic)	126	68.0%	2.0%		10.0%						Rosser2000
Spanish	IE (Italic)	2121	67.3%	1.6%	7.2%	8.9%	9.8%	3.2%	--	1.3%	0.8%	Martinez2016
Ibiza islanders	IE (Italic)	54	57.4%	0.0%	1.9%	7.4%		13.0%		16.7%		Zalloua2008
Majorca islanders	IE (Italic)	62	66.1%	0.0%	8.1%	6.2%		6.2%		1.6%		Zalloua2008
Menorca islanders	IE (Italic)	37	73.0%	2.7%	2.7%	18.9%		0.0		0.0		Zalloua2008
Spanish (South)	IE (Italic)	162	65.0%	2.0%	6.0%	9.0%		4.0%		0.0%		Zalloua2008
Valencians	IE (Italic)	73	64.0%	3.0%	10.0%	11.%0		1.0%		1.0%		Zalloua2008
Swedes (Northern)	IE (Germanic, North)	48	22.9%	18.8%		2.1%	2.1%		8.3%			Rosser2000
Swedes	IE (Germanic, North)	1800+	21%	18%	45%	1%	1%	3%	2%	-	Q=3	FTDNA 2016
Swedes	IE (Germanic, North)	110	20.0%	17.3%								Helgason2000
Swedes	IE (Germanic, North)	225			40%							Rootsi2004
Swedes	IE (Germanic, North)	160	13.1%	24.4%	37.5%	1.3%	0.0%		14.4%			Lappalainen2008
Swiss	IE (German/Italic)	606	55%	4%	16%	7%	6%	9%	0%	0%	K=1	Zieger 2020
Tatars	Turkic	126	8.7%	24.1%	4.0%				33.0%			
Turks	Turkic	523	16%	7%	5%	11%	33%	11%	4%	2%	L=4, Q=2, C=1, R2=1, H=1, A+DE*+R*+O = 2	Cinnioglu 2004
Turks (Istanbul)	Turkic	81	15%	9%	10%	12%	27%	7%	2%	4%	L=5, C=4, DE*=5	Cinnioglu 2004
Turks (Bulgaria)	Turkic	63	8%	10%	19%	13%	24%	6%	5%		H=11, Q=3	Zaharova 2001
Udmurt	Uralic (Finnic)	87	2.3%	10.35%	1.1%				85.06%			
Ukrainians	IE (Slavic, East)	759	7.9%	43.2%	27.2%	7.4%	3.8%	3%	5.4%	1.3%	0.8%	Kushniarevich2015
Ukrainians	IE (Slavic, East)				21.9%	8.6%	7.3%					
Ukrainians	IE (Slavic, East)	53	18.9%	41.5%	24.5%		9.4%	0.0%	5.7%	0.0%		Varzari2006
Welsh (Anglesey)	IE (Celtic)	88	88.64%	1.0%		3.0%						Wilson2001
Welsh (Anglesey)	IE (Celtic)	196			8.1%							Rootsi2004

== Chronological development of haplogroups ==
Haplogroup	Possible time of origin	Possible place of origin	TMRCA in Europe
E	69,000 years ago	East Africa or West Asia	38–59,000 years ago
D	68,300 years ago	Asia	
C	c. 53,000 years ago	Asia	>35,000 years ago
F			38–56,000 years ago
IJ			30–46,000 years ago
K			40–54,000 years ago
E-M215 (E1b1b)	31–46,000 years ago		39–55,000 years ago
P			27–41,000 years ago
J	19–44,500 years ago		
R			20–34,000 years ago
I		Balkans	15–30,000 years ago
R-M173			13–26,000 years ago
I-M438	28–33,000 years ago		16–20,000 years ago
E-M35	20–30,000 years ago		15–21,000 years ago
J-M267	15–34,000 years ago		
R-M420 (R1a)	25,000 years ago	Eurasia (Iran?)	8–10,000 years ago
R-M343 (R1b)	22,000 years ago	West Asia	
N	at least 21,000 years ago (STR age)		
I-M253	11–21,000 or 28–33,000 years ago		3–5,000 years ago
J-M172	15–22,000 years ago		19–24,000 years ago
E-M78	15–20,000 or 17,500–20,000 years ago	Northeast Africa	at least 17,000 years ago
E-V12	12,500–18,000 years ago		
R-M17	13 ,000 or 18,000 years ago	India	
I-L460	present 13,000 years ago		
I-M223	11–18,000 years ago		
E-V13	7–17,000 years ago	West Asia	5–9,000 years ago (Balkan); 4–4,700 years ago (Europe); 6,800–17,000 years ago (Asia)
R-Z280			11–14,000 years ago
N-M46	at least 12,000 years ago (STR age)		
R-M458			11,000 years ago
I-P37	6–16,000, present 10,000 years ago		
I-M423	present 10,000 years ago		
I-M26	2–17,000, present 8,000 years ago		
R-M269			5,500–8,000 years ago
R-L11, R-S116			3–5,000 years ago

== See also ==
- Europe
  - Genetic history of Europe
  - Ethnic groups in Europe
  - Demographics of Europe
- Y-DNA haplogroups by population
  - Y-DNA haplogroups in populations of the Near East
  - Y-DNA haplogroups in populations of North Africa
  - Y-DNA haplogroups in populations of Sub-Saharan Africa
  - Y-DNA haplogroups in populations of the Caucasus
  - Y-DNA haplogroups in populations of South Asia
  - Y-DNA haplogroups in populations of East and Southeast Asia
  - Y-DNA haplogroups in populations of Oceania
  - Y-DNA haplogroups in populations of Central and North Asia
  - Y-DNA haplogroups in indigenous peoples of the Americas
