= Y-DNA haplogroups in populations of the Caucasus =

Genetics concept

Various Y-DNA haplogroups have differing frequencies within each ethnolinguistic group in the Caucasus region.

== Table ==
The table below lists the frequencies – identified by major studies – of various haplogroups amongst selected ethnic groups from the Caucasus. The first two columns list the ethnic and linguistic affiliations of the individuals studied, the third column gives the sample size studied, and the other columns give the percentage of the particular haplogroup.

Language family abbreviations:
IE Indo-European
NEC Northeast Caucasian
NWC Northwest Caucasian
Kartvelian South Caucasian

Population	Language	n	E1b1b	G	I	J1	J2	L	R1a	R1b	R2a	T	Others	Reference
Abaza (Abazins/Abazinians)	NWC (Abkhaz-Ubykh)	14	0	29	0	See "Others".	7	See "Others".	14	0	0	See "Others".	K[xP]=14 (possible L or T); C*=7 (1/14); F[xI,G,J2,K]=29 (possible J1)	Nasidze 2004a
Abaza (Abazins/Abazinians)	NWC (Abkhaz-Ubykh)	88	4.5	40.9	I2*=1.1; I2a=2.3	J1*=2.3; J1e=3.4	M67=1.1 other=10.2	2.3=L2	23.9	3.4	1.1	0.0	3.4=Q	Yunusbayev 2012
Abkhaz	NWC (Abkhaz-Ubykh)	12	0	0	33	0	25	0	33.0	8	0	0		Nasidze 2004a
Abkhaz	NWC (Abkhaz-Abaza)	58	1.7	56.9	0	0	J2*=5.2; J2-M67=8.6	3.4=L2	10.3	12.1		1.7		Balanovsky 2011
Abkhaz	NWC (Abkhaz-Abaza)	162	0.6	47.5	3.1 (P37.2=0.6, M223=1.9)	3.1 (P58=1.2)	26.5 (M67=11.1)	2.5	13.0	7.4	0	0	N=0.6	Yunusbaev2012
Adygei (Kabardin)	NWC (Adigei)	59	0	28.8	10.2	See "Others".	11.9	See "Others".	1.7	1.7	0	See "Others".	F[xG,I,J2,K]=23.7 (possible J1); K[xP]=15.3 (possible L); P[xR1,R2]=6.8	Nasidze 2004a
Adygei (Kabardin)	NWC (Adygei)	140	2.1	43.6	I1=1.4; I2*=0.7; I2a=2.1	J1e=2.8; J1*=6.4	M67=5.7; J2a*=9.3; J2b=0.7	0.7=L3	15.0	3.6	0.0	0.7	C=2.1, H=0.7; N1c=1.4, Q=0.7	Yunusbayev 2012
Adygei/ "Circassians" (Note: despite the fact that Shapsugs were also technically "Circassian", Dibirova labels this population "Circassians". In Rootsi, they are called "Adygei", or some variation of the word.)	NWC (Adygei)		0.0	31.3	I*=1.4; I2a=2.9									various
Adygei/ ("Adygea")	NWC (Adygei)	154	0.6	47.4	I2*=1.3; I2a=3.2	J1e=1.3; J1*=1.9	M67=3.2; J2a*=5.8; J2b=1.9	L2=1.9; L1=0.6	14.3	7.1	0.0	0.0	C=2.6; N=0.6	Yunusbayev 2012
Adygei (Shapsugs)	NWC (Adygei)	106		81.1										Dibirova 2009
Adygei (Shapsugs)	NWC (Adygei)	100	1.0	87.0	0	0	6.0	2.0=L*	4.0	0		0		Balanovsky 2011
Adygei ("Cherkess") (Note: These are labeled "Circassians" (at least in the English version), but the sample was taken from the Karacheyo-Cherkess Republic, so they are labeled "Cherkess" here.)	NWC (Adygei)	142	1.4	39.8	0.7=I*	J1e=0.7; J1*=4.9	J2-M67=7.7; J2b=0.7 other=13.4	0.7=L1	19.7	4.9		0.7	N1*=1.4; N1c1=2.1; Q=0.7	Balanovsky 2011
Adygei ("Cherkess")	NWC (Adygei)	126	0.8	45.2	I1=0.8; I2b=0.8	J1e=4.0; J1*=0.8	M67=13.5 other=11.1	0.0	15.1	1.6	0.8	0.0	C=0.8, K*=1.6; N1c1=2.4, Q=0.8	Yunusbayev 2012
Andis	NEC (Avar-Andic, Andic)	49	2.0	6.1	I1=2.0; I2a=24.5	J1*=36.7	M67=14.3 other=4.1	0.0	2.0	6.1	0.0	2.0		Yunusbayev 2012
Armenians	IE (Armenian)	89	3.4	29.2					5.6	24.7		3.4		Rosser 2000
Armenians	IE (Armenian)	47	4.3	F*	4.3	F*	21.3	4.3	8.5	36.2	0	6.4	F[xI,J2,K]=12.8; N=2	Wells 2001
Armenians	IE (Armenian)	100	6.0	11.0	5.0	See "Others".	24.0	See "Others".	6.0	19.0	2.0	4.0	F[xI,G,J2,K]=18.0 (possible J1); K[xT,P]=3.0 (possible L); P[xR1a,R1b,R2]=2.0	Nasidze 2004a
Armenians	IE (Armenian)	734	5.4						5.3	32.4			1.6	Weale 2001
Armenians (TOTAL)	IE (Armenian)	413	5.1	P16= 0.5; G2a*= 8.2; G1=0.7	I2=3.6	J1e= 4.4; J*=6.3	M67= 10.7; J2a* = 13.3; J2b= 1.5	1.9	1.7	29.1	4.6	8.5	N=0.2; Q=0.2	Herrara2012
Armenians (Ararat Valley)	IE (Armenian)	110	5.5	P16=0; G2a*=9.1; G1=1.8	I2=2.7	J1e=6.4; J1*=8.2	M67=12.7; J2a*=10.0; J2b=0.9	0.9	0.9	37.3	0.0	3.6	0.0	Herrara2012
Armenians (Sason)	IE (Armenian)	104	2.9	P16= 1.9; G2a*=10.6	0.0	J1e= 2.9; J1* = 6.7	M67= 7.7; J2a* = 9.6; J2b = 0	3.8	1.0	15.4	17.3	20.2		Herrara2012
Avars	NEC (Avar-Andic, Avar)	42	7.1	0.0	0.0	66.7	4.8	9.5	2.4	2.4	2.4	4.8		Yunusbayev 2012
Avars	NEC (Avar-Andic, Avar)	115	0.0	P18=0.9; P303=9.6	I*=0.9; I2a=0.9	J1e=0.9; J1*=58.3	M67=0.9 other=5.2	L2=2.6	1.7	14.8	0.9	0.0	N=1.7	Balanovsky 2011
Avars (West) (Note: This is significant, as in Western Avaria, where the population was sampled, there are large number of non-Avars- Andic and Dido peoples- who are in fact ethnically misclassified as Avars by the Dagestani census.)	NEC (Avar-Andic)	20	0	G[xG1,G2a, G2b]=5	0	J1*=60; J1e=20	10	0	0	5				Caciagli 2009
Azeris (Azerbaijan)	Turkic	72	5.6	18.1	2.8	F	30.6	6.9	6.9	11.1	2.8	4.2	F[xG,I,J2,K]=11	Nasidze 2004a
Azerbaijanis	Turkic	v	4.1			15.2	23.9							various
Bagvalins	NEC (Avar-Andic, Andic)	28	0.0	0.0	I2b1=7.1	21.4	0.0	0.0	3.6	67.9	0.0	0.0		Yunusbayev 2012
Balkars	Turkic	38	2.6	28.9	I2*=2.6	0	M67=5.3; J2b=2.6 other=15.8	L2=5.3	13.2	13.2	7.9	0.0	H=2.6	Battaglia 2009
Balkars	Turkic	135	0	32.6	3.0 (all P37.2)	3.7 (P58=0.0)	15.6 (M67=9.6)	0	28.1	13.3	0	0	Q=3.7%, no others.	Yunusbaev 2012
Chamalins	NEC (Avar-Andic, Andic)	27	0.0	18.5	0.0	66.7	3.7	3.7	7.4	0.0	0.0	0.0		Yunusbayev 2012
Chechens (East Chechnya)	NEC (Nakh)	19	0	5	0		26	5	5	0	16	5	F[xG,I,J2,K]=32	Nasidze 2004a
Chechens (Total) (Note: Made by combining the Malgobek, Achkhoy-Martan and Khasavyurt Chechen populations)	NEC (Nakh)	330	0.0	5.4	I2=0.3	J1*=20.9	M67=55.2; J2b=0.3 other=1.2	L3=7.0	3.9	1.8	3.3	0.0		Balanovsky 2011
Chechens (Achkhoy-Martan, Chechnya)	NEC (Nakh)	118	0	0.8 (P303)	I2=0.8	J1*=24.6	M67=56.8 other=0.8	L3=6.8	2.5	3.4	3.4	0		Balanovsky 2011
Chechens (Malgobek, Ingushetia)	NEC (Nakh)	112	0	9.0	0	21.4	M67=50.9; J2b=0.9 other=1.8	L3=0.9	8.0	0.9	6.3	0		Balanovsky 2011
Chechens (mainly Akkis, in Dagestan)	NEC (Nakh)	100	0	7.0	0	16.0	M67=58.0 other=1.0	L3=14.0	1.0	1.0	0	0	N=2.0	Balanovsky 2011
Chechens	NEC (Nakh)	165	1.2	1.8	0.0	24.2; P58=0.0	48.5; M67=46.7	17.6	0.6	0.6	0.0	0.0	N=0.6; Q=4.8	Yunusbaev 2012
Dargins	NEC (Dargin)	68	0	2.9	0	91.2	2.9	0.0	0.0	2.9	0.0	0.0		Yunusbayev 2012
Dargins	NEC (Dargin)	26	4	4	58	See "Others".	4	0	0	4	0	0	F[xG,I,J2,K]=27	Nasidze 2004a
Dargins (Dargwa)	NEC (Dargin)	101	0	P303=1.0 other=1	0	J1*=69.3; J1e=1	M67=1.0	0	21.8	2.0	0	0	O3=3	Balanovsky 2011
Dargins (Kaitaks)	NEC (Dargin)	33	0	0	0	J1*=84.8	3.3	0	3.3	6.7	3.3	0		Balanovsky 2011
Dargins (Kubachis)	NEC (Dargin)	65	0	0	I2a=1.5	J1*=98.5	0	0	0	0	0	0		Balanovsky 2011
Georgians	Kartvelian (Karto-Zan)	63	2.0	30.1	0.0	J=36.5		1.6	7.9	14.3	6.3	1.6		Semino 2000
Georgians	Kartvelian (Karto-Zan)	66	3.0	31.8	I1*=1.5	4.5	M67=18.2 other=13.6	L3=1.6	10.6	9.1	4.5	1.6		Battaglia 2009
Georgians	Kartvelian (Karto-Zan)	77	2.6	31.2	3.9	F	20.8	2.6	10.4	10.4	1.3	2.6	K[xP]=2.6; P[xR1,R2]=2.6; F[xG,I,J2,K]=14.3	Nasidze 2004a
Svans	Kartvelian (Svan)	25	0	F*	0	F*	0	0	8	0	0	0	F[xG,I,J2,K]= 92%	Wells 2001
Georgians (Kazbegis)	Kartvelian (Karto-Zan) (Note: Although the Kazbegi Georgians speak Georgian, and have most likely done so for centuries, it is theorized by some that their (possible) ancestors, the Tzanars, who inhabited the region in Medieval and Ancient times, were a Nakh-speaking people, like Chechens and Ingush, possibly accounting for their large frequencies of J2)	25	0	F	4	F	72	0	4	8	0	0	F[xG,I,J2,K]=12	Wells 2001
Ingush	NEC (Nakh)	143	0	P18=1.4	0.7	2.8	M67=87.4 other=1.4	L3=2.8	3.5	0		0		Balanovsky 2011
Ingush	NEC (Nakh)	22	0	5.0	5	0	32	5	0	0	0	0	F[xG,I,J2,K]=27; P[xR1,R2]=4.5(1/22)	Nasidze 2004a
Ingush	NEC (Nakh)	105	0.0	4.8	0.0	1.9	81.9 (all M67)	8.6	2.9	0	0	0		Yunusbaev 2012
Juhurim	AA (Semitic)	10	0	0	0	30 (all P58)	50 (M67=10%)	20	0	0	0	0		Yunusbaev 2012
Karachays	Turkic	69	0	31.9	8.7 (P37.2=7.2, M223=1.5)	7.2 (P58=2.9)	11.6 (M67=5.8)	0	27.5	10.1	0	2.9	0.0	Yunusbaev 2012
Kumyks	Turkic	76	2.6	11.8	0.0	21.1	25.0	0.0	13.2	19.7	3.9	1.3	J*=1.3; O=1.3	Yunusbaev 2012
Laks	NEC (Lak)	21	9.5	4.8	14.3	42.9	14.3	0.0	9.5	4.8	0.0	0.0		Caciagli 2009
Lezgins (Azerbaijan)	NEC (Lezgic)	12	17		0	See "Others".	0		8	17	0		F[xI,J2,K]=58	Wells 2001
Lezgins (Dagestan)	NEC (Lezgic)	25	0	36	0	See "Others".	0		0	4	0	See "Others".	F[xI,G,J2,K]=32 (possible J1); K[xR]=28	Nasidze 2003
Lezgins	NEC (Lezgic)	31	6.5	9.7	9.7	58.1	0.0	0.0	0.0	16.1	0.0	0.0		Yunusbaev 2012
Lezgins (Akhtynskiy District)	NEC (Lezgic)	81	1.2	13.5 (P18=1.2%)	0	44.4 J1*	2.5	1.2 L2	3.7	29.6	0	2.5	1.2 N1c1	Balanovsky 2011
Kara Nogai	Turkic	76	0	1.3	13.2 I-P37.2	2.6 J*	10.5 (M67 = 1.3%)	0	17.1	18.4	0	0	C=10.5; D=5.3; N=14.5; O=5.3; Q=1.3	Yunusbayev 2012
Kuban Nogai	Turkic	87}	0	13.8	0	21.8	16.1; M67=3.4%	0	12.6	17.2	0	1.1	C=8.0% D=1.1% N=4.6% O=3.4% Q=0.0%	Yunusbayev 2012
Ossetes	IE (Iranian, NE)	47	6.4			J=34.0			2.1	42.6				Rosser 2000
North Ossetians	IE (Iranian, NE)	129	0	57.4	10.1	See "Others".	14.0		0.8	0.8	1.6	See "Others".	F[xI,G,J2,K]=3.9 (possible J1); K[xP]=9.3 (possible L); P[xR1,R2]=2.3	Nasidze 2004b
North Ossetians (Iron)	IE (Iranian, NE)	230	0.4	74.3	0	1.3	M67=11.3 other=7.0	L2=0.9	0.4	3.0		0	N=0.4; Q=0.9	Balanovsky 2011
North Ossetians (Digor)	IE (Iranian, NE)	127	0.8	60.6	0	3.9	M67=5.5 other=6.3	L1=0.8	0.8	16.5		0.8	Q=3.9	Balanovsky 2011
North Ossetians	IE (Iranian, NE)	132	1.5	69.7	0.0	3.8	18.2 (M67=9.8)	0.8	0.8	4.5	0	0	Q = 0.8	Yunusbaev 2012
Russians (Adygea)	IE (Slavic, East)	78			24.4									Rootsi 2004
Rutulians	NEC (Lezgic)	24	0.0	37.5	0.0	See "Others".	4.2	0.0	0.0	0.0	0.0	0.0	F[xG,I,J2,K]=58	Nasidze 2004a
Tabassarans	NEC (Lezgic)	43	0.0	0.0	0.0	48.8	2.3	0.0	2.3	39.5	0.0	0.0	C=7.0	Yunusbaev 2012

== See also ==
- Caucasus
  - Peoples of the Caucasus
  - Languages of the Caucasus
- Y-DNA haplogroups by groups

- Y-DNA haplogroups in populations of Europe
- Y-DNA haplogroups in populations of the Near East
- Y-DNA haplogroups in populations of North Africa
- Y-DNA haplogroups in populations of Central and North Asia
- Y-DNA haplogroups in populations of South Asia
- Y-DNA haplogroups in populations of Sub-Saharan Africa
- Y-DNA haplogroups in populations of East and Southeast Asia
- Y-DNA haplogroups in populations of Oceania
- Y-DNA haplogroups in indigenous peoples of the Americas

== Sources ==
- Balanovsky, O; Dibirova, K; Dybo, A; Mudrak, O; Frolova, S; Pocheshkhova, E; Haber, M; Platt, D; Schurr, T; Haak, W; Kuznetsova, M; Radzhabov, M; Balaganskaya, O; Romanov, A; Zakharova, T; Soria Hernanz, DF; Zalloua, P; Koshel, S; Ruhlen, M; Renfrew, C; Wells, RS; Tyler-Smith, C; Balanovska, E; The Genographic Consortium (2011). "Parallel Evolution of Genes and Languages in the Caucasus Region". Mol. Biol. Evol. 28 (10): 2905–2920. doi:10.1093/molbev/msr126. PMC 3355373. PMID 21571925.
- Battaglia, V; Fornarino, S; Al-Zahery, N; Olivieri, A; Pala, M; Myres, NM; King, RJ; Rootsi, S; Marjanovic, D; Primorac, D; Hadziselimovic, R; Vidovic, S; Drobnic, K; Durmishi, Naser; Torroni, A; Santachiara-Benerecetti, AS; Underhill, PA; Semino, O (2009). "Y-chromosomal evidence of the cultural diffusion of agriculture in southeast Europe". Eur. J. Hum. Genet. 17 (6): 820–830. doi:10.1038/ejhg.2008.249. PMC 2947100. PMID 19107149.
- Caciagli, L; Bulayeva, K; Bulayev, O; Bertoncini, S; Taglioli, L; Pagani, L; Paoli, G; Tofanelli, S (2009). "The key role of patrilineal inheritance in shaping the genetic variation of Dagestan highlanders". J. Hum. Genet. 54 (12): 689–694. doi:10.1038/jhg.2009.94. hdl:11577/3233090. PMID 19911015.
- Cruciani, F; La Fratta, R; Santolamazza, P; Sellitto, D; Pascone, R; Moral, P; Watson, E; Guida, V; Colomb, EB; Zaharova, B; Lavinha, J; Vona, G; Aman, R; Calì, F; Akar, N; Richards, M; Torroni, A; Novelletto, A; Scozzari, R (2004). "Phylogeographic Analysis of Haplogroup E3b (E-M215) Y Chromosomes Reveals Multiple Migratory Events Within and Out Of Africa". Am. J. Hum. Genet. 74 (5): 1014–1022. doi:10.1086/386294. PMC 1181964. PMID 15042509.
- Di Giacomo, F; Luca, F; Popa, LO; Akar, N; Anagnou, N; Banyko, J; Brdicka, R; Barbujani, G; Papola, F; Ciavarella, G; Cucci, F; Di Stasi, L; Gavrila, L; Kerimova, MG; Kovatchev, D; Kozlov, AI; Loutradis, A; Mandarino, V; Mammì, C; Michalodimitrakis, EN; Paoli, G; Pappa, KI; Pedicini, G; Terrenato, L; Tofanelli, S; Malaspina, P; Novelletto, A (2004). "Y chromosomal haplogroup J as a signature of the post-neolithic colonization of Europe" (PDF). Hum. Genet. 115 (5): 357–371. doi:10.1007/s00439-004-1168-9. PMID 15322918. S2CID 18482536.
- Nasidze, I; Schädlich, H; Stoneking, M (2003). "Haplotypes from the Caucasus, Turkey and Iran for nine Y-STR loci". Forensic Sci Int. 137 (1): 85–93. doi:10.1016/S0379-0738(03)00272-X. hdl:11858/00-001M-0000-0010-06CC-D. PMID 14550619.
- Nasidze, I; Ling, EY; Quinque, D; Dupanloup, I; Cordaux, R; Rychkov, S; Naumova, O; Zhukova, O; Sarraf-Zadegan, N; Naderi, GA; Asgary, S; Sardas, S; Farhud, DD; Sarkisian, T; Asadov, C; Kerimov, A; Stoneking, M (2004a). "Mitochondrial DNA and Y-chromosome variation in the Caucasus". Ann Hum Genet. 68 (3): 205–221. doi:10.1046/j.1529-8817.2004.00092.x. PMID 15180701. S2CID 27204150.
- Nasidze, I; Quinque, D; Dupanloup, I; Rychkov, S; Naumova, O; Zhukova, O; Stoneking, M (2004b). "Genetic Evidence Concerning the Origins of South and North Ossetians". Ann Hum Genet. 68 (6): 588–599. doi:10.1046/j.1529-8817.2004.00131.x. PMID 15598217. S2CID 1717933.
- Rootsi, S; Magri, C; Kivisild, T; Benuzzi, G; Help, H; Bermisheva, M; Kutuev, I; Barać, L; Peričić, M; Balanovsky, O; Pshenichnov, A; Dion, D; Grobei, M; Zhivotovsky, LA; Battaglia, V; Achilli, A; Al-Zahery, N; Parik, J; King, R; Cinnioğlu, C; Khusnutdinova, E; Rudan, P; Balanovska, E; Scheffrahn, W; Simonescu, M; Brehm, A; Goncalves, R; Rosa, A; Moisan, J-P; Chaventre, A; Ferak, V; Füredi, S; Oefner, PJ; Shen, P; Beckman, L; Mikerezi, I; Terzić, R; Primorac, D; Cambon-Thomsen, A; Krumina, A; Torroni, A; Underhill, PA; Santachiara-Benerecetti, AS; Villems, R; Semino, O (2004). "Phylogeography of Y-Chromosome Haplogroup I Reveals Distinct Domains of Prehistoric Gene Flow in Europe" (PDF). Am. J. Hum. Genet. 75 (1): 128–137. doi:10.1086/422196. PMC 1181996. PMID 15162323.
- Rosser, ZH; Zerjal, T; Hurles, ME; Adojaan, M; Alavantic, D; Amorim, A; Amos, W; Armenteros, M; Arroyo, E; Barbujani, G; Beckman, G; Beckman, L; Bertranpetit, J; Bosch, E; Bradley, DG; Brede, G; Cooper, G; Côrte-Real, HBSM; de Knijff, P; Decorte, R; Dubrova, YE; Evgrafov, O; Gilissen, A; Glisic, S; Gölge, M; Hill, EW; Jeziorowska, A; Kalaydjieva, L; Kayser, M; Kivisild, T; Kravchenko, SA; Krumina, A; Kučinskas, V; Lavinha, J; Livshits, LA; Malaspina, P; Maria, S; McElreavey, K; Meitinger, TA; Mikelsaar, A-V; Mitchell, RJ; Nafa, K; Nicholson, J; Nørby, S; Pandya, A; Parik, J; Patsalis, PC; Pereira, L; Peterlin, B; Pielberg, G; Prata, MJ; Previderé, C; Roewer, L; Rootsi, S; Rubinsztein, DC; Saillard, J; Santos, FR; Stefanescu, G; Sykes, BC; Tolun, A; Villems, R; Tyler-Smith, C; Jobling, MA (2000). "Y-chromosomal diversity in Europe is clinal and influenced primarily by geography, rather than by language". Am. J. Hum. Genet. 67 (6): 1526–1543. doi:10.1086/316890. PMC 1287948. PMID 11078479.
- Semino, O; Passarino, G; Oefner, PJ; Lin, AA; Arbuzova, S; Beckman, LE; De Benedictis, G; Francalacci, P; Kouvatsi, A; Limborska, S; Marcikiæ, M; Mika, A; Mika, B; Primorac, D; Santachiara-Benerecetti, AS; Cavalli-Sforza, LL; Underhill, PA (10 Nov 2000). "The Genetic Legacy of Paleolithic Homo sapiens sapiens in Extant Europeans: A Y Chromosome Perspective". Science. 290 (5494): 1155–1159. Bibcode:2000Sci...290.1155S. doi:10.1126/science.290.5494.1155. PMID 11073453.
- Weale, ME; Yepiskoposyan, L; Jager, RF; Hovhannisyan, N; Khudoyan, A; Burbage-Hall, O; Bradman, N; Thomas, MG (2001). "Armenian Y chromosome haplotypes reveal strong regional structure within a single ethno-national group". Hum. Genet. 109 (6): 659–674. doi:10.1007/s00439-001-0627-9. PMID 11810279. S2CID 23113666.
- Wells, RS; Yuldasheva, N; Ruzibakiev, R; Underhill, PA; Evseeva, I; Blue-Smith, J; Jin, L; Su, B; Pitchappan, R; Shanmugalakshmi, S; Balakrishnan, K; Read, M; Pearson, NM; Zerjal, T; Webster, MT; Zholoshvili, I; Jamarjashvili, E; Gambarov, S; Nikbin, B; Dostiev, A; Aknazarov, O; Zalloua, P; Tsoy, I; Kitaev, M; Mirrakhimov, M; Chariev, A; Bodmer, WF (28 August 2001). "The Eurasian Heartland: A continental perspective on Y-chromosome diversity". Proc. Natl. Acad. Sci. USA. 98 (18): 10244–10249. Bibcode:2001PNAS...9810244W. doi:10.1073/pnas.171305098. PMC 56946. PMID 11526236.
- Yunusbayev, B; Kutuev, I; Khusainova, R; Guseinov, G; Khusnutdinova, ĖK (2006). "Genetic Structure of Dagestan Populations: A Study of 11 Alu Insertion Polymorphisms". Hum. Biol. 78 (4): 465–476. doi:10.1353/hub.2006.0059. JSTOR 41466426. PMID 17278621. S2CID 25503148.
- Yunusbayev, B; Metspalu, M; Järve, M; Kutuev, I; Rootsi, S; Metspalu, E; Behar, DM; Varendi, K; Sahakyan, H; Khusainova, R; Yepiskoposyan, L; Khusnutdinova, EK; Underhill, PA; Kivisild, T; Villems, R (2012). "The Caucasus as an asymmetric semipermeable barrier to ancient human migrations" (PDF). Mol. Biol. Evol. 29 (1): 359–365. doi:10.1093/molbev/msr221. PMID 21917723.
