= Y-DNA haplogroups in populations of the Near East =

Listed here are notable ethnic groups and populations from West Asia, Egypt and South Caucasus by human Y-chromosome DNA haplogroups based on relevant studies. The samples are taken from individuals identified with the ethnic and linguistic designations in the first two columns, the third column gives the sample size studied, and the other columns give the percentage of the particular haplogroup. (IE = Indo-European, AA = Afro-Asiatic) Some old studies conducted in the early 2000s regarded several haplogroups as one haplogroup, e.g. I, G and sometimes J were haplogroup 2, so conversion sometimes may lead to unsubstantial frequencies below.

== Table ==
Population	Language (if specified)	n	E	G	I	J	L	N	R1a	R1b	T	Q	Reference
Afro-Iranians	IE (Iranian, West)	12	33.3	0	0	16.6	8.3	0	16.7	16.7	0		Grugni2012
Arabs (Bedouin)	AA (Semitic)	32	18.7	0	6.3	65.6	0	0	9.4	0	0		Nebel2001
Arabs (Egypt)	AA (Semitic)	147	39.5	8.8	0.7	32	0	0	2.7	4.1	8.2		Luis2004
Arabs (Egypt)	AA (Semitic)	370	46.8	5.7	0.5	27.6	0.8	0	2.2	5.9	6.2		Bekada2013
Arabs (Egypt)	AA (Semitic)	92	46.8	2.2	1.1	22.8	0	0	0	5.4	7.6		Wood2005
Arabs (Egypt)	AA (Semitic)	147	38	9	1	31	0	0	3	2	8		AbuAmero2009
Arabs (Egypt)	AA (Semitic)	35	68.6	0	0	31.4	0	0	0	0	0		Kujanová2009
Arabs (Egypt)	AA (Semitic)	1024	41.9	4.0	0	32.0	0	0	0	9.1	9.1		Amer2026
Arabs (Egypt - South)	AA (Semitic)	47	78.7	0	0	0	0	0	0	0	0		Trombetta2015
Arabs (Egypt - North)	AA (Semitic)	49	42.9	0	0	0	0	0	0	0	0		Trombetta2015
Arabs (Egypt - Mansoura)	AA (Semitic)	44	51.3	0	0	18.2	0	0	2.3	9.9	0		Arredi2004
Arabs (Egypt - Luxor)	AA (Semitic)	66	80.3	0	0	7.5	0	0	0	0	0		Lucotte2003
Arabs (Egypt - Luxor)	AA (Semitic)	29	31.0	0	0	31.0	0	0	3.4	3.4	17.2		Arredi2004
Arabs (Egypt - Alexandria)	AA (Semitic)	162	64.8	0	0	19.1	0	0	0	0	0		Lucotte2003
Arabs (Iran – Khuzestan)	AA (Semitic)	57	3.6	21.1	0	58	1.8	0	3.5	5.2	0		Grugni12
Arabs (Iraq)	AA (Semitic)		9.2	0	0	50.6	0	0	0	0	0		Semino2004
Arabs (Iraq)	AA (Semitic)	254	14.9	2.7	1.6	57.4	2.4	0.4	6.3	5.9	2		Lazim2020
Arabs (Jordan)	AA (Semitic)	146	26	4.1	3.4	43.8	0	0	1.4	17.8	0		AbuAmero2009
Arabs (Jordan – Amman)	AA (Semitic)	101	17.8	5.9	4.9	56.4	0	0	1.9	5.9	0		Flores2005
Arabs (Jordan- Dead Sea)	AA (Semitic)	45	44.5	0	0	15.5	0	0	0	40	0		Flores2005
Arabs (Kuwait – Bedouin)	AA (Semitic)	148	6.6	3.4	0	84	0	0	6.7	1.3	0		Mohammad2010
Arabs (Oman)	AA (Semitic)	121	23.1	1.7	0	47.9	0.8	0	9.1	1.7	8.3		Luis2004
Arabs (Palestine – Muslim)	AA (Semitic)	143	20.3	7	6.3	55.2	0	0	1.4	8.4	1.4		Nebel2001
Arabs (Palestine – Christian)	AA (Semitic)	44	31.8	11.3	0	9	0	0	0	0	0		Fernandes2011
Arabs (Qatar)	AA (Semitic)	72	8.4	2.8	0	66.7	2.8	0	6.9	1.4	0		Cadenas2008
Arabs (Saudi Arabia)	AA (Semitic)	157	15.2	3.2	0	58	1.9	0	5.1	1.9	5.1		AbuAmero2009
Arabs (Syria)	AA (Semitic)	20	10	0	5	30	0	0	10	15	0		Semino2000
Arabs (Syria)	AA (Semitic)	520	13.5	5.5	2	55.7	0	0	5.2	4.5	0		Zalloua2008 & El-Sibai2009
Yemeni (Soqotra)	AA (Semitic)	63	9	0	0	85.7	0	0	1.6	0	0		Cerny2009
Arabs (UAE)	AA (Semitic)	164	16.1	4.3	0	45.1	3	0	7.3	4.3	4.9		Cadenas2008
Arabs (Yemen)	AA (Semitic)	62	16.1	1.6	0	82.3	0	0	0	0	0		Cadenas2008
Arabs (Yemen)	AA (Semitic)	46	17.3	2.1	0	73.9	0	0	4.3	0	0		Haber2019
Armenians	IE (Armenian)	89	3.4	0	0	29.2	0	3.4	5.6	24.7	0		Rosser2000
Armenians	IE (Armenian)	100	6	11	5	24	0	0	6	19	0		Nasidze2004
Armenians	IE (Armenian)	734	5.4	0	0	0	1.6	0	5.3	32.4	0		Weale2001
Armenians (Iran – Tehran)	IE (Armenian)	34	5.8	20.5	5.8	32.3	2.9	0	2.9	23.5	0		Grugni12
Assyrians (Iran)	AA (Semitic)	48	4.2	8.3	0	29.2	0	0	8.3	29.2	8.3		Grugni 2012
Assyrians (Iran – Tehran)	AA (Semitic)	9	22.2	11.1	0	11.1	0	0	0	55.6	0		Grugni 2012
Assyrians (Iran – West Azerbaijan)	AA (Semitic)	39	0	7.7	0	33.4	0	0	10.3	23.1	10.3	5.2	Grugni12
Azerbaijanis	Turkic	72	6	18	3	31	0	0	7	11	0		Nasidze2004
Azerbaijanis	Turkic	97	4.1	0	0	0	0	0	0	0	0		Cruciani2004
Azerbaijanis (Iran – West Azerbaijan)	Turkic	63	11	8	0	29.8	3.2	0	19	17.5	7.9	4.8	Grugni12
Baloch	IE (Iranian, NW)	25	8	0	0	16	24	0	28	8	0		Sengupta2006
Baloch	IE (Iranian, NW)	24	4.2	4.2	0	41.6	16.6	0	25	0	0	4.2	Grugni12
Berbers (Egypt)	AA (Berber)	93	18.5	3.2	0	14	0	0	0	28	0		Dugoujon2009
Copts (Egypt)	AA (Egyptian)	100	74	7	0	1	0	0	0	0	0		Crubézy2010
Chechens	Caucasian (North East)	330	0	5.4	0.3	77.6	7	0	3.9	1.8	0		Balanovsky 2011
Cypriots	IE (Greek)	45	27	0	0	0	0	0	2	9	0		Rosser2000
Dargins	Caucasian (North East)	68	0	2.9	0	94.1	0	0	0	2.9	0		Yunusbayev2012
Dargins (Kaitaks)	Caucasian (North East)	33	0	0	0	88.1	0	0	3.3	6.7	0		Balanovsky 2011
Dargins (Kubachis)	Caucasian (North East)	65	0	0	1.5	98.5	0	0	0	0	0		Balanovsky 2011
Druze	AA (Semitic)	28	14.3	0	0	0	0	0	0	0	0		Cruciani2004
Druze	AA (Semitic)	329	18.8	12.4	0.6	33.4	6.3	0	1.5	14.5	0		Marshall2016 & Behar2010
Georgians	Caucasian (South)	63	0	30.1	0	36.5	1.6	0	7.9	14.3	1.6		Semino2000
Georgians	Caucasian (South)	66	3	31.8	1.5	36.4	1.5	0	10.6	9.1	1.5		Battaglia2008
Gilaks	IE (Iranian, NW)	64	3.2	15.7	1.6	36	4.8	0	9.4	20.4	0	1.6	Grugni12
Ingush	Caucasian (North East)	143	0	1.5	0.7	91.6	2.8	0	3.5	0	0		Balanovsky 2011
Iranians (Bandar)	IE (Iranian, NW)	131	14.6	8.5	0.8	16.8	9.9	0	22.2	8.4	3.1	1.6	Grugni12
Iranians (Qeshm)	IE (Iranian, NW)	44	2	10.1	0	42.8	8.2	0	20.4	0	4.1	2	Grugni12
Iranians (North Iran)	IE (Iranian, West)	33	0	15.2	0	33.3	3	6.1	6.1	15.2	0		Regueiro2006
Iranians (South Iran)	IE (Iranian, West)	117	6.8	12.8	0	35	6	0.9	16.2	6	3.4		Regueiro2006
Iranians	IE (Iranian, West)	130	4.6	5.4	24.6	13.8	0	0	19.2	4.6	0		Nasidze2004
Iranians		938	8.8	11.7	0.5	31.4	5	0.1	14.3	10.1	3.4		Grugni2012
Iraqis		203	11.8	2.5	0.5	57.6	1	1	6.9	10.8	5.9		Abu A. 2009
Jews (Ashkenazi)	AA (Semitic)	79	22.8	3.8	6.3	43	0	0	12.7	11.4	0		Nebel2001
Jews (Ashkenazi)	AA (Semitic)	442	19.9	9.7	4.1	38	0.2	0.2	0	0	0		Behar2004.
Jews (Ashkenazi)	AA (Semitic)	737	16.1	9.8	3.0	35.9; J1: 15% J2: 21%	1.2	0.2	4.2	11.5; M267:8%	2.7		Hammer et al. 2009 Non-Levites or Cohanim.
Jews (Kurdish)	AA (Semitic)	95	12.1	19.2	6.1	37.4	1	0	4	20.2	0		Nebel2001
Jews (Sephardic)	AA (Semitic)	78	19.2	7.7	11.5	28.2	0	0	3.9	29.5	0		Nebel2001
Jews (Tunisian)	AA (Semitic)	34	0	0	0	100	0	0	0	0	0		Manni et al. (2005)
Kurds (Iran)	IE (Iranian, NW)	59	20.4	11.9	1.7	28.9	1.7	0	20.3	1.7	0		Grugni12
Kurds (Northern Iraq)	IE (Iranian, NW)	95	7.4	4.2	16.8	40	3.2	0	11.6	16.8	0		Nebel2001
Arabs (Lebanon)	AA (Semitic)	1,403	16.9	6.7	3.3	47.2	4.8		2	7.7	4.3		Platt2021
Lurs	IE (Iranian, SW)	50	11.8	15.7	0	23.6	3.9	0	5.9	23.5	3.9	5.9	Grugni12
Mazandarenis	IE (Iranian, NW)	70	5.6	20.9	0	40.3	1.4	0	11.1	4.2	0		Grugni12
Parsis (India – Lay)	IE (Iranian, SW)	122	5.7	0	0	54.9	2.5	0	5.7	0	0		López2017
Parsis (India – Priest)	IE (Iranian, SW)	71	1.4	0	0	4.2	54.9	0	0	0	0		López2017
Parsis (Iran – Lay)	IE (Iranian, SW)	76	11.8	0	0	55.3	1.3	0	5.3	0	0		López2017
Parsis (Iran – Priest)	IE (Iranian, SW)	8	0	0	0	50	0	0	12.5	0	0		López2017
Parsis (Iran – Tehran)	IE (Iranian, SW)	13	30.8	0	0	38.5	0	0	0	23.1	0		Grugni12
Parsis (Iran – Yazd)	IE (Iranian, SW)	34	14.7	5.9	0	41	5.9	0	17.6	2.9	0		Grugni12
Persians (Iran – Fars)	IE (Iranian, NW)	44	13.7	9.2	0	36.3	6.8	0	4.5	11.4	6.8	4.5	Grugni12
Persians (Iran – Isfahan)	IE (Iranian, SW)	11	0	0	9.1	54.6	0	0	18.2	0	0	9.1	Grugni12
Persians (Iran – Khurasan)	IE (Iranian, SW)	59	3.0	3.4	2.9	9.0	3.0	2.9	18.2	16.7	2.9	6.8	Grugni12
Persians (Iran – Yazd)	IE (Iranian, SW)	46	10.7	14.9	0	36.2	4.2	0	12.8	4.3	6.4		Grugni12
Samaritans (Tribe of Levi)	AA (Semitic)	2	100	0	0	0	0	0	0	0	0		Oefner2013
Samaritans (Tribe of Joseph)	AA (Semitic)	10	0	0	0	100	0	0	0	0	0		Oefner2013
Turkmen	Turkic	68	4.3	5.7	0	14.3	5.8	0	14.5	4.3	1.4	42.6	Grugni12
Turks	Turkic	523	11.3	10.9	5.4	33.3	4.2	3.8	6.9	16.1	2.5		Cinnioglu2004
Turks	Turkic	741			5.1	33.3							Rootsi2004
Turks	Turkic	167	10.2	0	0	32.9	0	2.4	4.8	20.4	0		Rosser2000
Turks	Turkic	59	13.6	8.5	6.8	30.5	0	0	11.9	20.3	1.7		Sanchez2005
Turks (Central Anatolia)	Turkic	61	6.6										Pericic2005
Turks (Istanbul)	Turkic		13			24.7							Semino2004
Turks (Konya)	Turkic		14.5			31.8							Semino2004
Turks (Cypriot)	Turkic	46	13										Cruciani2004
Turks (Southeastern)	Turkic	24	4.2										Cruciani2004
Turks (Erzurum)	Turkic	25	4										Cruciani2004
Zoroastrians (Tehran)	IE (Iranian, NW)	13	30.8			38.5				23.1		7.7	

== See also ==
- Near East and North Africa
  - Genetic history of North Africa
  - Demographics of the Arab League
  - Genetic history of the Middle East
  - Genetic origins of the Turkish people
  - Y-chromosomal Aaron
- Y-DNA haplogroups by population
  - Y-DNA haplogroups in populations of Europe
  - Y-DNA haplogroups in populations of North Africa
  - Y-DNA haplogroups in populations of Sub-Saharan Africa
  - Y-DNA haplogroups in populations of the Caucasus
  - Y-DNA haplogroups in populations of South Asia
  - Y-DNA haplogroups in populations of Central and North Asia
  - Y-DNA haplogroups in populations of East and Southeast Asia
  - Y-DNA haplogroups in populations of Oceania
  - Y-DNA haplogroups in indigenous peoples of the Americas
