= Y-DNA haplogroups in populations of Central and North Asia =

Research into the predominant human Y-DNA haplogroups of Central Asia and North Asia, broken down according to both individual publications and ethnolinguistic groups, are summarized in the table below.

The first two columns of the table list ethnicity and linguistic affiliations, the third column cites the total sample size in each study, and the adjoining columns give the percentage of each haplogroup or subclade found sample in a particular sample.

== List ==
Population	Language	n	C	I	J	K* (xNO,P)	N	O2	O (xO2)	P* (xQ,R)	Q	R1a	R1b/R1*	R2	Others	Reference
Altaians	Turkic	98	22.4	0			3.0				17.3	46.9	0			Tambets 2004
Altaians	Turkic	92	13.0	2.2	2.2	0	7.6			28.3		41.3	1.1		D = 3	Derenko 2005
Altaians (northern)	Turkic	50		0	2		10					38	6			Kharkov 07
Altaians (southern)	Turkic	96	3	2.1	4.2	5.2	11.5	7.3		1	4.2	53.1	1		E = 1	Kharkov 2007
Buryats	Mongolic	238	63.9	0.4	0	8.8	20.2			1.7	1.7	2.1	0.8		G = 0.4	Derenko 2005
Chukchis	Chukotko-Kamchatkan	24	4.2	0	0	0	54.3	0		5	20.8	15.7	0	0	0	Lell 2001
Dolgans	Turkic	67	37.3	1.5			34.1					16.4	1.5			Tambets 2004
Dungans	Sino-Tibetan	40		2.5	12.5	2.5	2.5	40	5	0	7.5	10	5	5	F(xIJ) = 5	Wells 2001
Evens	Tungusic	31	74.2	3.2			12.9				0	6.5	0			Tambets 2004
Evenks	Tungusic	96	67.7	5.2			19.8				4.2	1	0			Tambets 2004
Itelmens	Chukotko-Kamchatkan	18	24	0	0	0	65	0		0	6	5	0	0	0	Lell 2001
Kalmyks	Mongolic	68	70.6	0	0	4.4	2.9			11.8		5.9	2.9		L = 1.5	Derenko 2005
Karakalpaks	Turkic	44	22.7	0	9.1	6.8	2.3	11.4		0	0	18.2	9.1	6.8	F(xIJ) = 9, L = 5	Wells 2001
Kazakhs	Turkic	54	66.7	0	0	0	1.9	9.3		5.6	0	3.7	5.6	1.9	D = 2, F(xIJ) = 2	Wells 2001
Kazakhs	Turkic	30	40		13.3	10		10		3.3			6.7		F(xIJ) = 17	Karafet 2001
Kazakhs (more)	Turkic	1982	40	1	8		7	8	0		2	7	6	1		Maksat 2017
Kazakhs (Altai Republic)	Turkic	119	59.7 (C3)	0	4.2	0	0	26.1		0	0.8	0.8	2.5	0	G = 5, T = 0.8	Dulik 2011
Kets	Yeniseian	48	6.2	0	0	0	0	0			93.7	0	0	0	0	Tambets 2004
Khakas	Turkic	53	5.7	3.8	0	5.7	41.5			7.6		28.3	7.6			Derenko 2005
Khants	Uralic	47	0	0	0	0	76.60% (36/47)	0		0	0	4.26% (2/47)	19.15% (9/47)	0	0	Tambets 2004
Koryaks	Chukotko-Kamchatkan	27	22.2	0	0	0	59.2	0		18.6	0	0	0	0	0	Lell 2001
Kyrgyz	Turkic	52	13.5	1.9	1.9	1.9	1.9	1.9	5.8	1.9	0	63.5	1.9	0	O1 = 5.8	Wells 2001
Mongolians	Mongolic	65	53.8		3.1	1.5	10.8	10.8	1.5	4.6		9.2			D = 1.5, O2 = 1.5	Xue 2006
Nenets	Uralic	148	0	0			97.30% (144/148)				1.35% (2/148)	0	0			Tambets 2004
Nganasans	Uralic	38	5.26% (2/38)	0			92.11% (35/38)					0	0			Tambets 2004
Nivkhs	Nivkh (isolate)	17	47							35						Lell 2001
Pashtun(Afghan)	Indo-European	87	1.1	0	5	0	0	0	2.2	0	2.2	56			L = 6 G=13	Cristofaro2013
Romanis (Uzbekistan)	Indo-European	15	0	0	20	0	0	7		0	0	0	0	53	H = 13	Wells 2001
Selkups	Uralic	131	1.5	0			6.9				66.4	19.1	6.1			Tambets 2004
Shors	Turkic	51	2	0	0	0	15.7	0		2	0	58.8	19.6	0	F(xIJ) = 2	Derenko 2005
Tajiks	Indo-European	38	2.6	0	18.4	0	0	0		0	0	44.7	0	7.9	L = 8, H = 5, E = 3	Wells 2001
Teleuts	Turkic	47	8.5	4.3	2.1	0	10.6			0		55.3	12.8		F(xIJ) = 6.4%	Derenko 2005
Tofalars	Turkic	32	6.3	3.1	0	3.1	59.4	0		3.1	0	12.5	12.5	0	0	Derenko 2005
Turkmens	Turkic	30	0	0	17	13	0	0		10	0	7	37	3	F(xIJ) = 13	Wells 2001
Tuvans	Turkic	113	7.1	0.9	0	8.9	23.9			35.4		17.7			G = 0.9; F(xIJ) = 3.5	Derenko 2005
Tuvans	Turkic	108									38.0		1.9 (R-M73)	0		Malyarchuk 2011
Uyghurs	Turkic	70	4.3		11.4	7.1	8.6	11.4		(see "Others")	(see "Others")	18.6	(see "Others")	(see "Others")	P(xR1a) = 17.1	Xue 2006
Uyghurs	Turkic	67	7.5		10.4		6.0	10.5			3.0	(see "Others")	(see "Others")	(see "Others")	D3 = 4.5, G = 4.5, L = 4.5, R = 46.3	Hammer 2005
Uyghurs	Turkic	187 (four samples)	5.3	0.35	15.7		5.0	(see "Others")	16.2		6.78	21.6	6.7	2.6	D = 3.75, E= 2.1, G = 1.5, H = 3.15, L = 3.8, O(xO3) = 16.2, T = 0.5	Zhong 2010
Uzbeks	Turkic	366	11.5	2.2	13.4	6.8	1.4	4.1		5.5	0	25.1	9.8	2.2	F(xIJK) = 7.9, L = 3, E = 2, D = 2	Wells 2001
Yaghnobis	Indo-European	31	3	0	32	3	0	0		3	0	16	32	0	L = 10	Wells 2001
Yakuts	Turkic	155	3.2	1.3			88.4				0	1.9	1.9			Tambets 2004
Yukaghir	Yukaghir	13	31 (C3)	0	0	0	31	0		0	31	0	0	0	F(xIJ) = 8	Duggan 2013
Yupik	Eskimo–Aleut	33	0				50.6	0		21.2	21.2	0				Lell 2001

== See also ==
- Y-DNA haplogroups in Kazakh tribes
- Demography of Central Asia
- Indigenous peoples of Siberia
- Y-DNA haplogroups by population
  - Y-DNA haplogroups in populations of the Caucasus
  - Y-DNA haplogroups in populations of South Asia
  - Y-DNA haplogroups in populations of East and Southeast Asia
  - Y-DNA haplogroups in populations of the Near East
  - Y-DNA haplogroups in populations of North Africa
  - Y-DNA haplogroups in populations of Europe
  - Y-DNA haplogroups in populations of Oceania
  - Y-DNA haplogroups in populations of Sub-Saharan Africa
  - Y-DNA haplogroups in indigenous peoples of the Americas
