= Y-DNA haplogroups in populations of North Africa =

Listed here are the human Y-chromosome DNA haplogroups found in various ethnic groups and populations from North Africa and the Sahel (Tuaregs).

== By population ==
Population	Language (if specified)	n	A/B	E(xE1b1b)	E-M215	G	I	J	R1a	R1b	Other	Study
Algerians	AA (Semitic)	377	0.3	13.0	54.6			19.9			12.2	Bekada et al. (2015)
Amazighs (Algeria - Aurès)	AA (Tamazight)	218	0	4.6	84.4	0	0.5	5.5	2.3	0	1.7	Abdeli and Benhassine (2019)
Amazighs (Algeria - Mzab)	AA (Tamazight)	67	0	4.5	89.6	1.5	0	1.5	0	3	0	Dugoujon et al. (2009)
Amazighs (Algeria - Mzab)	AA (Tamazight)	20	0	10	80	0	0	0	0	10	0	Bekada et al. (2015)
Amazighs (Algeria - Tizi Ouzou)	AA (Tamazight)	16	0	0	47.3	0	0	15.7	0	15.7	0	Arredi et al. (2004)
Amazighs (Algeria - Tuat)	AA (Tamazight)	35	0	25.6	51.4	0	0	11.4	0	8.5	0	Bekada et al. (2014)
Amazighs (Egypt - Siwa)	AA (Tamazight)	93	28	6.5	12	3.2	0	14	0	28	8.3	Dugoujon et al. (2009)
Amazighs (Libya)	AA (Tamazight)	83	1.3	38.5	53	0	0	0	0	0	0	Bekada et al. (2013)
Amazighs (Morocco)	AA (Tamazight)	64	0	6.3	79.6	0	0	0	0	0	14.1	Semino et al. (2004)
Amazighs (Morocco - Amizmiz)	AA (Tamazight)	33	3	6.1	90.8	0	0	0	0	0	0	Alvarez et al. (2009)
Amazighs (Morocco - Asni)	AA (Tamazight)	54	0	9.3	85.2	0	0	1.9	0	1.9	1.9	Dugoujon et al. (2009)
Amazighs (Morocco - Bouhria)	AA (Tamazight)	67	0	7.5	79.1	6	0	3	4.5	0	0	Dugoujon et al. (2009)
Amazighs (Morocco - Middle Atlas)	AA (Tamazight)	69	2.9	5.7	81.1	4.3	0	5.8	0	0	0	Dugoujon et al. (2009)
Amazighs (Morocco - North)	AA (Tamazight)	55	0	12.7	65.1	0	0	0	0	0	12.7	Semino et al. (2004)
Amazighs (Morocco - South)	AA (Tamazight)	35	0	2.5	85	0	0	0	0	0	12.5	Semino et al. (2004)
Amazighs (Tunisia - Bou Omrane)	AA (Tamazight)	40	0	5	92.5	0	0	0	0	0	0	Ennafaa et al. (2011)
Amazighs (Tunisia - Bou Saad)	AA (Tamazight)	40	0	0	92.5	0	0	5	0	0	2.5	Ennafaa et al. (2011)
Amazighs (Tunisia - Chenini–Douiret)	AA (Tamazight)	27	0	0	100	0	0	0	0	0	0	Fadhlaoui-Zid et al. (2011)
Amazighs (Tunisia - Djerba)	AA (Tamazight)	46	2.2	0	80.4	0	0	10.9	4.3	2.2	0	Manni et al. (2005)
Amazighs (Tunisia - Kesra)	AA (Tamazight)	23	8.7	0	91.3	0	0	0	0	0	0	Cherni et al. (2005)
Amazighs (Tunisia - Tekrouna)	AA (Tamazight)	19	0	0	100	0	0	0	0	0	0	Frigi, S. et al. (2006)
Amazighs (Tunisia - Sejenane)	AA (Tamazight)	47	4.3	2.1	51.1	2.1	2.1	36.1	0	0	2.2	Frigi, S. et al. (2006)
Amazighs (Tunisia - Jradou)	AA (Semitic)	32	0	0	100	0	0	0	0	0	0	Fadhlaoui-Zid et al. (2011)
Amazighs (Tunisia - Sened)	AA (Tamazight)	35	0	0	65.7	0	0	31.4	0	0	0	Fadhlaoui-Zid et al. (2011)
Andalusians (Tunisia - Qalaat Al-Andalus)	AA (Arabic)	19	0	0	89.5	0	0	10.5	0	0	0	Cherni et al. (2005)
Andalusians (Tunisia - Testour)	AA (Arabic)	48	2.1	2.1	68.7	0	0	25.0	2.1	0	0	Cherni et al. (2005)
Andalusians (Tunisia - Esslouguia)	AA (Arabic)	22	0	0	59.1	0	0	18.2	13.6	4.6	4.5	Cherni et al. (2005)
Andalusians (Tunisia - El Alia)	AA (Arabic)	43	0	0	44.2	4.7	2.3	34.9	0	9.3	4.6	Cherni et al. (2005)
Arabs (Algeria - Algiers)	AA (Semitic)	35	0	2.9	54.3	0	0	28.6	0	0	0	Arredi et al. (2004)
Arabs (Algeria - Algiers)	AA (Semitic)	26	0	3.8	69.2	0	0	19.2	0	0	0	Bekada et al. (2014)
Arabs (Algeria - Oran)	AA (Semitic)	102	0	7.9	51	0	0	27.4	1	11.8	1	Robino et al. (2008)
Arabs (Algeria - Oran)	AA (Semitic)	80	1.2	11.2	47.5	0	0	23.7	0	7.5	0	Bekada et al. (2014)
Arabs (Algeria - Sahara)	AA (Semitic)	60	0	3.3	85	0	0	10	0	0	0	Bekada et al. (2014)
Nubians(Egypt)	Nilo-Saharan	46	0	0	86.9	0	0	4.4	0	0	8.7	Lucotte and Mercier et al. (2003)
Lower Egyptians (Egypt)	AA (Semitic)	370	1.4	3.0	43.8	5.7	0.5	27.6	2.2	5.9	10	Bekada et al. (2013)
Lower Egyptians (Egypt)	AA (Semitic)	147	2.7	2.7	36.1	9.5	0	31.9	3.4	4.1	2.1	Luis et al. (2004)
Delta Egyptians (Egypt - North)	AA (Semitic)	44	2.3	0	52.3	0	0	18.2	2.3	9.9	6.8	Arredi et al. (2004)
Upper Egyptians (Egypt - South)	AA (Semitic)	29	0	0	31	0	3.4	24.1	0	13.8	0	Arredi et al. (2004)
Bedouins (Egypt - Western Desert)	AA (Semitic)	35	0	5.7	62.9	0	0	31.4	0	0	0	Kujanová et al. (2009)
Libyans	AA (Semitic)	215	0	1.4	49.3	5.1	0	41.4	0.5	2.3	0	Fadhlaoui-Zid et al. (2013)
Arabs (Mauritania)	AA (Semitic)	189	0.5	12.7	66.6	0	0	13.2	0	7.4	0.1	Bekada et al. (2013)
Arabs (Morocco)	AA (Semitic)	49	0	0	75.5	0	0	20.4	0	0	0	Semino et al. (2004)
Arabs (Morocco)	AA (Semitic)	44	0	0	63.7	0	0	15.9	0	0	0	Semino et al. (2004)
Arabs (Morocco - Sahara)	AA (Semitic)	89	0	20.2	59.6	0	0	20.2	0	0	0	Fregel et al. (2009)
Arabs (Tunisia - Kairouan)	AA (Semitic)	49	2	0	83.8	2	0	10.2	0	0	2.0	Elkamel et al. (2021)
Arabs (Tunisia - Oueslatia)	AA (Semitic)	46	0	0	23.9	0	0	54.4	0	4.3	17.4	Elkamel et al. (2021)
Arabs (Tunisia - Djerba)	AA (Semitic)	47	0	0	93.6	0	0	4.3	0	0	2.1	Manni et al. (2005)
Arabs (Tunisia - Djerba)	AA (Semitic)	47	0	0	75	0	0	11.7	0	0	0	Ennafaa et al. (2011)
Arabs (Tunisia - Sousse)	AA (Semitic)	220	0.5	2.3	54.6	0.5	0	34.1	0.5	0.9	6.8	Fadhlaoui-Zid et al. (2015)
Arabs (Tunisia - Tunis)	AA (Semitic)	33	0	0	66.5	0	0	24.2	0	0	0	Fadhlaoui-Zid et al. (2011)
Arabs (Tunisia - Tunis)	AA (Semitic)	148	0	2	49.3	0	0	35.8	0.7	6.1	0.7	Arredi et al. (2004)
Arabs (Tunisia - Zaghouan)	AA (Semitic)	32	0	9.4	43.7	0	0	46.9	0	0	0	Fadhlaoui-Zid et al. (2011)
Arabs (Tunisia - Zriba)	AA (Semitic)	31	0	0	100	0	0	0	0	0	0	Cherni et al. (2005)
Copts of Sudan	AA (Egyptian)	100	0	74	0	7	0	1	0	0	15	Crubézy2010
Jews (Tunisia - Djerba)	AA (Semitic)	34	0	0	0	0	0	100	0	0	0	Manni et al. (2005)
Libyans	AA (Semitic)	175	0.6	0.6	44.6	1.1	1.1	34.3	1.7	5.1	10.9	Triki-Fendri et al. (2015)
Moroccans	AA (Semitic)	760	0.9	6	79	0.6	0.1	7.6	0	4.4	0	Bekada et al. (2013)
Moroccans	AA (Semitic)	316	0	0	52.5	0	0	1.2	0	3.4	42.9	Zalloua et al. (2008)
Moroccans	AA (Semitic)	221	0	6.4	75.9	0.9	0.5	9.1	0	4.1	0	Fregel et al. (2009)
Moroccans	AA (Semitic)	176	0	6.3	66.7	0	0	13.6	0	2.8	0	Bosch et al. (2001)
Moroccans	AA (Semitic)	51	3.9	5.9	54.9	0	0	19.6	0	3.9	0	Onofri et al. (2008)
Moroccans (Central)	AA (Semitic)	87	0	9.8	62.2	0	0	28	0	0	0	Fadhlaoui-Zid et al. (2013)
Spaniards (Canary Islands)	IE (Romance)	652	0	1.4	14.1	4	9.7	13.9	2.8	50.6	0	Fregel et al. (2009)
Subsaharans (Tunisia - Djerba)	AA (Semitic)	42	0	33.3	11.9	0	11.9	2.4	2.4	35.7	2.4	Khodjet-El-Khil, H. et al. (2005)
Tuaregs (Libya)	AA (Tamazight)	47	0	42.5	48.9	0	0	0	0	6.4	2.1	Ottoni et al. (2011)
Tunisians	AA (Semitic)	601	0.1	1.1	71.7	0.1	0.1	17.9	0.5	2.1	3.7	Bekada et al. (2013)
Tunisians	AA (Semitic)	62	0	0	82.3	0	0	8	0	0	9.7	Zalloua et al. (2008)
Tunisians (immigrants to Italy)	AA (Semitic)	52	0	0	57.7	0	0	38.4	0	0	0	Onofri et al. (2008)

== By samples from country ==
Samples over-represent the smaller populations which are usually the subject of genetic studies

Country	n	A	B	E-M33	E-M2	E-M35*	E-M78*	E-V12	E-V32	E-V13	E-V22	E-V65	E-M81	E-M34	F	G	I	J1	J2	K	L	O	P,R	Q	R1a	R1b-V88	R1b-M269	R2	T
Mauritania/Western Sahara	189	-	0.53	5.29	6.88	-	-	-	-	-	-	-	55.56	11.11	-	-	-	13.23	-	-	-	-	-	-	-	6.88	0.53	-	-
Morocco	760	0.26	0.66	2.76	3.29	4.21	0.79	0.26	-	0.26	1.84	3.68	67.37	0.66	0.26	0.66	0.13	6.32	1.32	0.53	-	-	0.26	-	-	0.92	3.55	-	-
Algeria	156	-	-	0.64	5.13	0.64	1.92	0.64	-	0.64	1.28	1.92	44.23	1.28	3.85	-	-	21.79	4.49	0.64	-	-	-	0.64	0.64	2.56	7.04	-	-
Tunisia	601	-	0.17	0.5	0.67	1.66	-	-	-	-	3	3.16	62.73	1.16	2.66	0.17	0.17	16.64	2.83	0.33	-	-	0.33	-	0.5	1.83	0.33	-	1.16
Libya	83	-	-	-	38.55	-	-	-	-	2.41	-	4.82	45.78	-	-	-	-	-	-	-	-	-	2.41	-	-	6.02	-	-	-
Egypt	370	1.35	-	0.54	2.43	3.24	0.81	7.03	1.62	0.81	9.19	2.43	11.89	6.76	1.08	5.68	0.54	20.81	6.75	0.27	0.81	0.27	0.54	0.27	2.16	2.97	2.97	0.54	6.22

== Geographic components for Y-DNA lineages ==
Component	Morocco (n=760)	Algeria (n=156)	Tunisia (n=601)	Mauritania/Western Sahara (189)	Egypt (370)
North Africa	79%	62.5%	71.7%	66.6%	43.7%
Middle East	7.6%	26.2%	19.4%	13.2%	27.5%
Europe	4.4%	9.5%	2.1%	7.4%	5.9%
West Africa	6%	5.7%	1.1%	12.1%	2.9%
East Africa	0.9%	0%	0.1%	0.5%	1.3%

== See also ==
- Africa
  - Maghrebis
  - List of ethnic groups of Africa
  - Languages of Africa
- Y-DNA haplogroups by group
  - Y-DNA haplogroups in populations of the Near East
  - Y-DNA haplogroups in populations of Europe
  - Y-DNA haplogroups in populations of the Caucasus
  - Y-DNA haplogroups in populations of South Asia
  - Y-DNA haplogroups in populations of East and Southeast Asia
  - Y-DNA haplogroups in populations of Oceania
  - Y-DNA haplogroups in populations of Central and North Asia
  - Y-DNA haplogroups in indigenous peoples of the Americas
