= Y-DNA haplogroups in populations of Oceania =

Listed here are notable ethnic groups and native populations from the Oceania (Pacific Islands and Australia) and East Indonesia by human Y-chromosome DNA haplogroups based on relevant studies.

Population	Language	n	C1	C*	K* (Note: It most likely includes basal clades of M, S, K2b1 (MS*), and/or K-M256)	M	O	S	Others	Reference
Australian Aborigines	Australian Aboriginal	108	60.2	6	22.2	0	0.9	0	R=8, F=3	Hudjashov 2007
Australian Aborigines	Australian Aboriginal	44	__	__	0	0	0	40.9	R=6.8 others=52.3	Karafet 2015
Arnhem Land peoples	Arnhem Land languages	60	53.3	10	30.0	0	0	0	5.0	Kayser 2002
Western Desert peoples	Wati languages	35	68.7	0	17.1	0	3.0	0	8.6	Kayser 2002
Alor	Oceanic, Papuan	26	46.2	3.8	30.8	11.5	0	7.7	0	Mona 2009
Pantar	Oceanic, Papuan	26	--	--	19.2		46.2	15.4		Karafet 2015
Bali	Austronesian	551	--	1.8	1.1	0.7	83.8	0.4	12.2	Karafet 2005
Bougainville	Oceanic, Papuan	75	1.3	--	36.0	41.3	14.7	1.3	F=5.3	Scheinfeldt 2006
Cenderawasih	Cenderawasih	11	0	45.5	18.2	36.4	0	0	0	Li 2008
Cook	Polynesian	70	83.3	--	7.5	0	4.6	0	R=2.8	Cox 2006
Fiji	Fijian–Polynesian	55	--	3	41	15	15	--		Capelli 2001
Fiji	Fijian–Polynesian	107	21.5	0.9	25.2	35.5	13.1	0	3.7	Kayser 2006
Flores	Austronesian	71	39.4	23.9	11.3	2.8	8.5	12.7	NO=1.4	Mona 2009
French Polynesia	Polynesian	87	--	53	8	0	37	--		Capelli 2001
Lesser Sunda Islands	Austronesian, Papuan	344	47.7	14.2	10.5	4.4	11.6	11.0	0.6	Mona 2009
Maori	Polynesian	54	42.6	--	1.9	--	5.6	--	51.9	Underhill 2001
Melanesia	Papuan, Oceanic	342	--	17.2	32.5	25.4	6.4	--	--	Capelli 2001
Melanesia	Papuan, Oceanic	400	12.5	0.2	8.7	57.0	8.7	12.5	0.2	Kayser 2006
Melanesia	Oceanic, Papuan	1272	--	9.4	33.1	42.1	7.4	6.2	1.9	Scheinfeldt 2006
Micronesia	Micronesian; Polynesian	32	--	18.7	65.6	0	9.4	--	6.2	Hurles 2005
Moluccas	Papuan	34	14.7	8.8	17.6	20.6	17.7	20.6	0	Kayser 2002
New Britain	Oceanic, Papuan	395	2.3	0	23.5	39.0	7.1	27.9	0	Scheinfeldt 2006
New Guinea	Papuan, Austronesian	44	4.5	0	0	20.4	9.1	63.6	F*=2.2	Hurles 2005
New Guinea	Papuan, Austronesian	277	17.3	0.4	8.3	59.6	1.8	12.3	P=0.4	Scheinfeldt 2006
Eastern New Guinea	Papuan	62	12.9	1.6	11.3	32.2	6.4	33.8	1.6	Kayser 2002
Western New Guinea	Papuan	183	16.9	--	5.5	76.0	0.5	1.1	0	Kayser 2002
New Ireland	Oceanic, Papuan	109	8.3	0	29.4	48.6	8.3	5.5	0	Scheinfeldt 2006
PNG coast	Papuan	31	12.9	9.7	16.1	29.0	9.7	23.2	P-M74=3.2	Kayser 2002
PNG Northern coast	Papuan	16	18.8	18.8	25.0	12.5	6.3		0	Kayser 2002
PNG Southern coast	Papuan	15	6.7	0	6.7	46.7	13.3		P-M74=6.7	Kayser 2002
PNG highlands	Papuan	38	3	0	10	32	3	53	0	Kayser 2002
PNG Eastern highlands	Papuan	17	5.9	0	5.9	35.3	5.9	0		Kayser 2002
PNG islands	Oceanic, Papuan	685	4.5	0	21.9	41.3	7.4	24.1	0	Scheinfeldt 2006
West Papua (province)	Papuan, Austronesian	133	44.4	--	23.3	29.3	3.0	0	0	Mona 2007
Polynesia	Polynesian	282	--	53.5	4.6	1.4	26.6	--	13.8	Scheinfeldt 2006
Polynesia	Polynesian	441	37.2	0.2	17.9	11.6	27.9	0.2	5.0	Kayser 2006
Rapa Nui	Polynesian	10	90	0	0	0	0	0	I=10	Karafet 2010
Samoa	Polynesian	62	61.3	--	3.2	3.2	25.8	1.6	4.8	Kayser 2006
Solomon	Oceanic	32	0	0	59.4	9.4	28.1	3.1	0	Cox 2006
Sulawesi	Austronesian	54	11.1	11.1	7.4	3.7	50.0	5.6	F=5.6, R=3.7	Karafet 2010
Sulawesi	Austronesian	177	__	__	5.7	1.1	63.8	5.1	R=6.8, P=0.6, others=16.9	Karafet 2015
Sumba	Austronesian	649	__	__	MS*=4.5	5.5	19	16.2	P=3, others=52.8	Karafet 2015
Tahiti	Polynesian	24	66.7	0	4.2	0	29.2	0	0	Karafet 2010
Timor	Austronesian, Papuan	509	__	__	MS*=10.2	6.1	17	8.7	P=11, others=47.4	Karafet 2015
East Timor	Austronesian, Papuan	39	35.9	7.7	17.9	7.7	17.9	12.8	0	Mona 2009
Tonga	Polynesian	55	--	23	1	8	60	--		Capelli 2001
Trobriands	Oceanic	53	9.4	--	22.6	30.2	37.7	0	0	Kayser 2002
Tuvalu	Polynesian	100	17	--	36	0	45	0	F=2	Kayser 2006
Vanuatu	Oceanic	234	--	17.5	40.6	29.5	4.3	6.4	R=1.7	Cox 2006

== See also ==
- Oceania
  - Languages of Oceania
  - Demographics of Oceania
  - List of Oceanian countries by population
