= Haplogroup D-M174 =

Human Y-chromosome DNA haplogroup

- Possible time of origin: 50,000–60,000 YBP; 65,200 (95% CI 62,100–68,300) YBP
- Coalescence age: 46,300 (95% CI 43,500–49,100] YBP
- Possible place of origin: Asia (probably South Asia or Central Asia or East Asia or Southeast Asia)
- Ancestor: D (CTS3946)
- Descendants: D1a (CTS11577); D1a1 (Z27276); D1a2 (Z3660); D1a2a (M55); D1a2b (Y34637); D1b (L1378)
- Defining mutations: M174, IMS-JST021355, PAGES00003

Haplogroup D1 or D-M174 is a subclade of haplogroup D-CTS3946. This broad lineage of the male-specific portion of the human Y chromosome is found primarily in East Asia, Magar-ethnic Nepal and the Andaman Islands. It is also found regularly with lower frequency in Central Asia, North Asia and Mainland Southeast Asia, and, more rarely, in Europe and West Asia.

== Origins ==
Human Y chromosome haplogroup D-M174 likely originated in Asia roughly 60,000 years ago. While haplogroup D-M174, along with haplogroup E, contains the distinctive YAP polymorphism—which indicates their closer ancestry than C—no haplogroup D-M174 chromosomes have been found outside of Asia. Haplogroup D1 is also often found in Southern Asia's populations.

Several studies (Hammer et al. 2006, Shinoda 2008, Matsumoto 2009) suggested that paternal haplogroup D-M174 originated in Central Asia.

A 2017 study by Mondal et al. finds that the Riang people (a Tibeto-Burmese population) and the Andamanese share the same D clade (D1a3, also known as D1a2b) and have their closest lineages with other clades in East Asia. The shared Jarawa and Onge D1a2b lineage dates back around 7,000 years ago. The East Asian D1a2b lineage diverged from the Japanese D1a2a lineage around 53,000 years ago. The authors conclude: "This strongly suggests that haplogroup D does not indicate a separate ancestry for Andamanese populations. Rather, haplogroup D was part of the standing variation carried by the Eastern OOA expansion, and later lost from most of the populations except in Andaman and partially in Japan and Tibet".

A 2019 study by Haber et al. argued that haplogroup D-M174 most likely diverged from haplogroup DE within Africa, and then participated in the expansion out of Africa with haplogroup C-M130 and haplogroup FT-M89.

A 2020 genetic study by Hallast et al. on ancient and modern haplogroups using a phylogenetic analysis of haplogroup C, D, and FT sequences—including very rare deep-rooting lineages such as D0/D2, a divergent D lineage not belonging to D-M174—argues that the initial splits within haplogroup CT (an ancestor of DE) occurred in Africa. It also argues that phylogeographic analyses of ancient and present-day non-African Y chromosomes all point to East/Southeast Asia as the origin of all known surviving non-African male lineages (apart from recent migrants) soon after an initial 70,000–55,000-year-ago migration from Africa of basal haplogroup D and other basal Y-lineages. It argues that these lineages then rapidly expanded across Eurasia, diversified in Southeast Asia, and expanded westward around 55,000–50,000 years ago, replacing other local lineages within Eurasia; haplogroup D (as D-M174) then underwent rapid expansions within Eastern Eurasian populations and consists of five branches that formed about 45,000 years ago. The study finds that these haplogroups currently have their greatest diversity in Eastern Eurasia (East/Southeast Asia).

== Overview ==
Haplogroup D-M174 is found today with high frequency among populations in Tibet, Magar-ethnic Nepal, northern Myanmar, Qinghai, the Japanese archipelago, and the Andaman Islands, though curiously not as much in the rest of India. The Ainu people of Japan and various Tibeto-Burmese people (such as the Tripuri people) are notable for possessing almost exclusively haplogroup D-M174 chromosomes. Haplogroup D-M174 chromosomes are also found at low to moderate frequencies among the Bai, Dai, Han, Hui, Manchu, Miao, Tujia, Xibe, Yao, and Zhuang peoples of China and among several minority populations of Sichuan and Yunnan that speak Tibeto-Burman languages and reside in close proximity to the Tibetans, such as the Jingpo, Jino, Mosuo, Naxi, Pumi, Qiang, and Yi.

Haplogroup D is also found in populations in China proper and in Korea, but with much lower frequency than in Tibet and Japan. A study published in 2011 found D-M174 in 2.49% (43/1729) of Han Chinese males, with frequencies tending to be higher than average toward the north and west of the country (8.9% of Shaanxi Han, 5.9% of Gansu Han, 4.4% of Yunnan Han, 3.7% of Guangxi Han, 3.3% of Hunan Han, and 3.2% of Sichuan Han). In another study of Han Chinese Y-DNA published in 2011, haplogroup D-M174 was observed in 1.94% (7/361) of a sample of unrelated Han Chinese male volunteers at Fudan University in Shanghai, with the origins of most of the volunteers being traced back to East China (Jiangsu, Zhejiang, Shanghai, and Anhui).

In Korea, haplogroup D-M174 was observed in 3.8% (5/133) of a sample from Daejeon, 3.5% (3/85) of a sample from Seoul, 3.3% (3/90) of a sample from Jeolla, 2.4% (2/84) of a sample from Gyeongsang, 2.3% (13/573) of another sample from Seoul, 1.4% (1/72) of a sample from Chungcheong, 1.1% (1/87) of a sample from Jeju, and 0.9% (1/110) of a third sample from Seoul-Gyeonggi. In other studies, haplogroup D-M174 has been observed in 6.7% (3/45) and 4.0% (3/75) of samples from Korea without any further specification of the area of sampling.

Little high-resolution data regarding the phylogenetic position of Han Chinese and Korean members of Y-DNA haplogroup D has been published, but the available data suggests that most Han Chinese members of haplogroup D should belong to clades found frequently among Tibetans (especially the D-M15 clade, also found among speakers of some Lolo-Burmese and Hmong-Mien languages), whereas most Korean members of haplogroup D should belong to the D-M55 clade, which is found frequently among Ainu, Ryukyuan, and Japanese people.

Haplogroup D Y-DNA has been found (albeit with low frequency) among modern populations of the Eurasian steppe, such as:

- Southern Altaians (6/96 = 6.3% D-M174(xM15), 6/120 = 5.0% D-P47)
- Kazakhs (1/54 = 1.9% D-M174, 6/1294 = 0.5% D)
- Nogais (4/76 = 5.3% D-M174 Kara Nogai, 1/87 = 1.1% D-M174 Kuban Nogai)
- Khalkhas (1/24 = 4.2% D-M174, 3/85 = 3.5% D-M174, 2/149 D-M15 + 2/149 D-P47 = 4/149 = 2.7% D-M174 total)
- Zakhchin (2/60 = 3.3% D-M174)
- Uriankhai (1/60 = 1.7% D-M174)
- Kalmyks (5/426 = 1.2% D-M174)

It has also been found among linguistically similar (Turkic- or Mongolic-speaking) modern populations of the desert and oasis belt south of the steppe, such as Yugurs, Bao'an, Monguors, Uyghurs, and Uzbeks. In commercial testing, members have been found as far west as Romania in Europe and Iraq in Western Asia.

Unlike haplogroup C-M217, haplogroup D-M174 is not found in the New World; it is not present in any modern Native American (North, Central, or South) populations. While it is possible that it traveled to the New World like haplogroup C-M217, those lineages apparently became extinct.

Haplogroup D-M174 is remarkable for its rather extreme geographic differentiation, with a distinct subset of chromosomes being found exclusively in each of the populations that contains a large percentage of individuals whose Y-chromosomes belong to haplogroup D-M174: haplogroup D-M15 among Tibetans, as well as other East/Southeast Asian populations that display low frequencies of haplogroup D-M174 Y-chromosomes; haplogroup D-M55 among the various populations of the Japanese archipelago and with low frequency among Koreans; and haplogroup D-P99 among the inhabitants of Tibet and some other parts of central Eurasia (e.g. Mongolia and the Altai). D-M174* without positive-tested subclades D-M15 or D-M55 is found at high frequencies among Andaman Islanders, and recently an Andamanese subclade was found to be D-Y34637 (D1a2b). Another type (or types) of paragroup D-M174* without positive-tested subclades of D-M15, D-P47, or D-M55 is found at a very low frequency among the Turkic and Mongolic populations of Central Asia, amounting to no more than 1% in total. This apparently ancient diversification of haplogroup D-M174 suggests that it may perhaps be better characterized as a "super-haplogroup" or "macro-haplogroup".

In one study, the frequency of haplogroup D-M174 without positive-tested subclades found among Thais was 10%. Su et al. (2000) found DE-YAP/DYS287(xM15) in 11.1% (5/45) of a set of three samples from Thailand—including 20% (4/20) North Thai, 20% (1/5) So, and 0% (0/20) Northeast Thai—and in 16.7% (1/6) of a sample from Guam. Meanwhile, the authors found D-M15 in 15% of a pair of samples of Yao, including 30% (3/10) Yao Jinxiu and 0% (0/10) Yao Nandan; 14.3% (2/14) of a sample of Yi; 3.8% (1/26) of a sample of Cambodians; and 3.6% (1/28) of a sample of Zhuang. Dong et al. (2002) found DE-YAP Y-chromosomes in 12.5% (2/16) of a sample of Jingpo from Luxi City, Yunnan, 10.0% (2/20) of a sample of Dai from Luxi City, and 1.82% (1/55) of a sample of Nu from Gongshan and Fugong, Yunnan.

== Distribution and subclades ==
The haplogroup D-M174 Y-chromosomes that are found among Tibeto-Burman populations as well as people of the Japanese archipelago belong to haplogroup D1a2b, D1a2a, and D1a1. D-M55 (D1a2a) is particularly distinctive, bearing a complex of at least five individual mutations along an internal branch of the haplogroup D-M174 phylogeny, thus distinguishing it clearly from the other haplogroup D-M174 chromosomes that are found among Tibetans and Andaman Islanders and providing evidence that Y-chromosome haplogroup D-M55 was the modal haplogroup in the ancestral population that developed the prehistoric Jōmon culture in the Japanese islands.

It is suggested that the majority of D-M174 Y-chromosome carriers migrated from Central Asia to East Asia. One group migrated to the Andaman Islands, thus forming or helping to form the Andamanese people. Another group stayed in modern Tibet and southern China (today Tibeto-Burman peoples), and a third group migrated to Japan, possibly via the Korean Peninsula (pre-Jōmon people).

=== D-Z27276 (D1a1) ===
Haplogroup D-Z27276 is the common ancestor of D-M15 and D-P99, which are common in Tibet (China).

==== D-M15 (D1a1a) ====
D-M15 was first reported to have been found in a sample from Cambodia and Laos (1/18 = 5.6%) and in a sample from Japan (1/23 = 4.3%) in a preliminary worldwide survey of Y-DNA variation in extant human populations.

Subsequently, Y-DNA belonging to haplogroup D-M15 has been found frequently among Tibeto-Burman-speaking populations of Southwestern China (including approximately 23% of Qiang, approximately 12.5% of Tibetans, and approximately 9% of Yi), and among Yao people inhabiting northeastern Guangxi (6/31 = 19.4% Lowland Yao, 5/41 = 12.2% Native Mien, 3/41 = 7.3% Lowland Kimmun), with a moderate distribution throughout Central Asia, East Asia, and continental Southeast Asia (Indochina).

A study published in 2011 found D-M15 in 7.8% (4/51) of a sample of Hmong Daw and in 3.4% (1/29) of a sample of Xinhmul from northern Laos.

==== D-P47 (D1a1b1) ====
This subclade is found with high frequency among Pumi, Naxi, and Tibetans,Lu D, Lou H, Yuan K, Wang X, Wang Y, Zhang C, et al. (September 2016). "Ancestral Origins and Genetic History of Tibetan Highlanders". American Journal of Human Genetics. 99 (3): 580–594. doi:10.1016/j.ajhg.2016.07.002. PMC 5011065. PMID 27569548. with a moderate distribution in Central Asia. According to one study, Tibetans have a frequency of about 41.31% of haplogroup D-P47.

=== D-Z3660 (D1a2) ===
For about 7,000 years, the natives of the Andaman Islands shared a common ancestry with each other. The closest lineage to the Andamanese is the Japanese haplogroup D, with which it has a very old relationship, dating back to about 53,000 years.

==== D-M55 (D1a2a) ====
Previously known as D-M55, D-M64.1/Page44.1 (D1a2a) is found with high frequency among Ainu and with medium frequency among Japanese and Ryukyuans.

Kim et al. (2011) found haplogroup D-M55 in 2.0% (1/51) of a sample of Beijing Han and in 1.6% (8/506) of a pool of samples from South Korea, including 3.3% (3/90) from the Jeolla region, 2.4% (2/84) from the Gyeongsang region, 1.4% (1/72) from the Chungcheong region, 1.1% (1/87) from the Jeju region, 0.9% (1/110) from the Seoul-Gyeonggi region, and 0% (0/63) from the Gangwon region. Hammer et al. (2006) found haplogroup D-P37.1 in 4.0% (3/75) of a sample from South Korea.

D-M116.1, which is a subclade of D-M55, has been observed in one individual in a sample from Micronesia (n=17) according to the supplementary material of a study published in 2006. D-M116.1 also has been observed in one individual in a pool of samples from West Timor (n=497); the pertinent individual is from Umaklaran, located on the north side of the island of Timor near the border with East Timor.

According to Mitsuru Sakitani, haplogroup D1 arrived from Central Asia to northern Kyushu via the Altai Mountains and the Korean Peninsula more than 40,000 years ago, and haplogroup D-M55 (D1a2a) was born in the Japanese archipelago.

==== D-Y34637 (D1a2b) ====
D1a2b (formerly one of D*) is found at high frequencies among Andaman Islanders, especially Onge (23/23 = 100%) and Jarawa (4/4 = 100%).

=== D-L1378 (D1b) ===
D1b (L1378, M226.2) has been found in commercial testing in two families from Mactan Island in the Cebu region of the Philippines, in the ethnic Rade people from Vietnam as well as an ancient sample from Malaysia.

=== D-M174* ===
D-M174 (xM15, P99, M55) is found in some tribes of Northeast India (among whom rates vary from 0% to 65%).

The basal D-M174 (xM15, P47, M55) has been found in approximately 5% of Altaians. Kharkov et al. found haplogroup D*(xD-M15) in 6.3% (6/96) of a pool of samples of Southern Altaians from three different localities, particularly in Kulada (5/46 = 10.9%) and Kosh-Agach (1/7 = 14%), though they did not test for any marker of the subclade D-M55 or D-P99. Kharkov et al. also reported finding haplogroup DE-M1(xD-M174) Y-DNA in one Southern Altaian individual from Beshpeltir (1/43 = 2.3%).

In 2023, D-M174 was found in one individual in La Crosse, Wisconsin.

== Phylogenetics ==
=== Phylogenetic history ===
Prior to 2002, there were in academic literature at least seven naming systems for the Y-chromosome phylogenetic tree. This led to considerable confusion. In 2002, major research groups came together and formed the Y Chromosome Consortium (YCC). They published a joint paper that created a single new tree. Later, a group of citizen scientists with an interest in population genetics and genealogy formed a working group to create an amateur tree. The table below brings together all of these works at the point of the landmark 2002 YCC tree. This allows a researcher reviewing older published literature to quickly move between nomenclatures.

| YCC 2002/2008 (Shorthand) | (α) | (β) | (γ) | (δ) | (ε) | (ζ) | (η) | YCC 2002 (Longhand) | YCC 2005 (Longhand) | YCC 2008 (Longhand) | YCC 2010r (Longhand) | ISOGG 2006 | ISOGG 2007 | ISOGG 2008 | ISOGG 2009 | ISOGG 2010 | ISOGG 2011 | ISOGG 2012 |
| D-M174 | * | * | * | * | * | * | * | * | D | D | D | D | D | D | D | D | D | D |
| D-M15 | 4 | IV | 3G | 12 | Eu5 | H3 | B | D1 | D1 | D1 | D1 | D1 | D1 | D1 | D1 | D1 | D1 | D1 |
| D-M55 | * | * | * | * | * | * | * | * | D2 | D2 | D2 | D2 | D2 | D2 | D2 | D2 | D2 | D2 |
| D-P12 | 4 | IV | 3G | 11 | Eu5 | H2 | B | D2a | D2a | D2a1a1 | D2a1a1 | D2 | D2 | D2a1a1 | D2a1a1 | D2a1a1 | removed | removed |
| D-M116.1 | 4 | IV | 3G | 11 | Eu5 | H2 | B | D2b* | D2a | D2a | D2a | D2a | D2a | D2a | D2a | D2a | removed | removed |
| D-M125 | 4 | IV | 3G | 11 | Eu5 | H2 | B | D2b1 | D2a1 | D2a1 | D2a1 | D2a1 | D2a1 | D2a1 | D2a1 | D2a1 | D2a1 | D2a1 |
| D-M151 | 4 | IV | 3G | 11 | Eu5 | H2 | B | D2b2 | D2a1 | D2a2 | D2a2 | D2a2 | D2a2 | D2a2 | D2a2 | D2a2 | D2a2 | D2a2 |

==== Research publications ====
The following research teams, per their publications, were represented in the creation of the YCC tree.

- α Jobling and Tyler-Smith (2000) and Kalaydjieva (2001)
- β Underhill (2000)
- γ Hammer (2001)
- δ Karafet (2001)
- ε Semino (2000)
- ζ Su (1999)
- η Capelli (2001)

=== Phylogenetic trees ===
By ISOGG tree(Version 14.151):

- DE (YAP) Nigeria, Guinea-Bissau, Caribbean, Tibet
  - D (CTS3946)
    - D1 (M174/Page30, IMS-JST021355) East Asia, Andaman Islands, Central Asia, Mainland Southeast Asia
      - D1a (CTS11577)
        - D1a1 (F6251/Z27276)
          - D1a1a (M15) Tibet, Altai Republic
          - D1a1b (P99) Tibet, Mongol, Central Asia
        - D1a2(Z3660)
          - D1a2a (M64.1/Page44.1, M55) Japan (Yamato people, Ryukyuan people, Ainu people)
          - D1a2b (Y34637) Andaman Islands (Onge people, Jarawa people)
      - D1b (L1378) Philippines
    - D2 (A5580.2) Nigeria, Saudi Arabia, Syria, United States, Yemen

== See also ==
=== Genetics ===
- Genetic genealogy
- Haplogroup
- Haplotype
- Human Y-chromosome DNA haplogroup
- Molecular phylogeny
- Paragroup
- Subclade
- Y-chromosome haplogroups in populations of the world
- Y-DNA haplogroups by ethnic group
- Y-DNA haplogroups in populations of East and Southeast Asia
- Y-DNA haplogroups in populations of Oceania

=== Y-DNA D-M174 subclades ===
- D-M116.1
- D-M125
- D-M15
- D-M151
- D-M174
- D-M55
- D-P12
