= Haplogroup CT =

Human Y chromosome DNA grouping indicating common ancestry

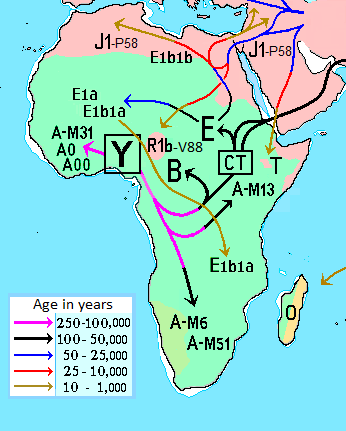
- Possible time of origin: ~70,000 BP, ~100,000 BP, or ~101,000 BP
- Possible place of origin: Africa, possibly Northeast Africa
- Ancestor: Haplogroup BT
- Descendants: Haplogroup CF, Haplogroup DE
- Defining mutations: P9.1, M168, M294, V9, V41, V54, V189, and V226

Haplogroup CT is a human Y chromosome haplogroup. CT has two basal branches, CF and DE. DE is divided into a predominantly Asia-distributed haplogroup D-CTS3946 and a predominantly Africa-distributed haplogroup E-M96, while CF is divided into an East Asian, Native American, and Oceanian haplogroup C-M130 and haplogroup F-M89, which dominates most non-African populations.

== Distribution ==
Men who are descended from the CT clade have Y chromosomes with the SNP mutation M168, along with P9.1 and M294. These mutations are present in all modern human male lineages except A and B-M60, which are both found almost exclusively in Africa.

The most recent common male line ancestor (TMRCA) of all CT men today probably predated the recent African origin of modern humans, a migration in which some of his descendants participated. He is therefore thought to have lived in Africa before this proposed migration. In keeping with the concept of "Y-chromosomal Adam" given to the patrilineal ancestor of all living humans, CT-M168 has therefore also been referred to in popularized accounts as being the lineage of "Eurasian Adam" or "Out of Africa Adam"; because, along with many African Y-lineages, all non-African Y-lineages descend from it.

No male in paragroup CT* has ever been discovered in modern populations. This means that all males carrying this haplogroup are also defined as being in one of the several major branch clades. All known surviving descendant lineages of CT are in one of two major subclades, CF and DE. In turn, DE is divided into a predominantly Asia-distributed haplogroup D-CTS3946 and a predominantly Africa-distributed haplogroup E-M96, while CF is divided into an East Asian, Native American, and Oceanian haplogroup C-M130 and haplogroup F-M89, which dominates most non-African populations.

== Subclades ==
=== CF ===
Haplogroup CF is a subclade of haplogroup CT.

=== DE ===
Haplogroup DE is a subclade of haplogroup CT.

== Phylogenetic trees ==
Haplogroup CT (M168/PF1416)

- CF (P143/PF2587, CTS3818/M3690/PF2668, CTS6376/M3711/PF2697) Shan people
  - C (M130/Page51/RPS4Y711, M216) Asia, Oceania, and North America
    - C1 F3393/Z1426
      - C1a CTS11043
        - C1a1 formerly C1 (M8, M105, M131) Japan
        - C1a2 Very low frequency in Western Eurasia (including Kostenki 38 000 years ago)
      - C1b
        - C1b1
          - C1b1a
            - C1b1a1 formerly C5 (M356) South Asia, Central Asia, and Southwest Asia
        - C1b2
          - C1b2a formerly C2 (M38) Indonesia, New Guinea, Melanesia, Micronesia, and Polynesia
          - C1b2b formerly C4 (M347) Indigenous Australians
    - C2 formerly C3 (M217, P44) Found throughout Eurasia and North America, but especially among Mongols, Kazakhs, Tungusic peoples, Paleosiberians, and Na-Dené-speaking peoples
  - F (M89, M213) Found throughout Eurasia, Oceania, and the Americas
    - F1 (P91, P104)
    - F2 (M427, M428)
    - F3 (P96)
    - F4 (M481)
  - GHIJK F1329/M3658/PF2622/YSC0001299, CTS2254/M3680/PF2657, FGC2045/Z12203 Throughout Eurasia; also The Americas; at low levels/among minorities in Africa and Oceania
    - G M201, P257 Primarily the Caucasus; also at low levels/among minorities in Europe, North Africa, South West Asia and Central Asia
    - HIJK Throughout Eurasia; also The Americas; at low levels/among minorities in Africa and Oceania
      - H M69, M370 South Asia, Central Asia, and Southwest Asia
      - IJK L15/S137, L16/S138 Eurasia, North Africa, Oceania, the Americas and East Africa
      - IJ M429/P125 Europe, Western Asia, North Africa and East Africa
        - I M170, M258, P19, P38, P212, U179 Europe
        - J 12f2.1, M304 Europe, Western Asia, South Asia, North Africa and East Africa
      - K M9 Found all over Eurasia; also significant in the Americas and Oceania; at lower levels in North Africa and East Africa
        - LT (K1) L298/P326
          - L M11, M20, M22, M61, M185, M295 the Indian subcontinent
          - T M70, M184/USP9Y+3178, M193, M272 (formerly K2) Southwestern Asia, South Asia, North Africa, the Horn of Africa, the Chad Basin, and Southern Europe
        - K2 M526 Eurasia, Oceania, The Americas, some indigenous Australians and some minorities in Africa
          - NO (K2a) M214 Reportedly found in small numbers of Buyi and Japanese males.
            - N M231 Eastern Europe, North Asia, and East Asia
            - O M175 Oceania, Southeast Asia, and East Asia
          - K2b formerly MPS P331 Eurasia, The Americas, Oceania and minorities in Africa
            - K2b1 formerly MS P397/P399 Melanesians, Micronesians, indigenous Australians and Polynesians.
              - M P256 Eastern Indonesia, Papua New Guinea, and Melanesia
              - S M230, P202, P204 (formerly K5) Eastern Indonesia, Papua New Guinea, and Melanesia
            - P (K2b2) 92R7, M45, M74/N12, P27.1/P207 Throughout Eurasia, The Americas and some minorities in Africa
              - Q M242 The Americas and Eurasia
              - R M207/UTY2, M306/S1 Europe, Near East, South Asia, Chad Basin, Canary Islands
          - K2c P261 Low levels in Bali
          - K2d P402/P403 Low levels in Java
          - K2e M147 Low levels in South Asia
- Haplogroup DE (M1/YAP, M145/P205, M203/Page36, P144, P153, P165, P167, P183) Asia, Africa, Southern and Eastern Europe; also at low levels in Oceania
  - Haplogroup D (M174) Primarily Japan, Tibet and Andaman Islanders; also at low level/among minorities in East Asia, Central Asia, Micronesia and Melanesia
    - Haplogroup D1 (CTS11577) Mainly Tibet; minorities in Central Asia, East Asia, and South East Asia
      - Haplogroup D1a Z27276 East and Central Asia
        - D1a1 (M15) (ex-D1) Qiang people; also at low levels throughout East and Central Asia
        - Haplogroup D1a2 P99 (ex-D3) Tibet and Central Asia
      - Haplogroup D1b (ex-D2) (M64.1/Page44.1, M55, M57, M179/Page31, M359.1/P41.1, P37.1, P190, 12f2.2) Mainly Japan; also at lowel levels/among minorities in Korea, China, Micronesia and Melanesia
    - Haplogroup D2 L1366 (ex-D1a) Philippines
  - Haplogroup E (M40, M96) Africa, Middle East, Southern and Eastern Europe
    - Haplogroup E1 (P147) At high levels throughout Africa; at lower levels in the Middle East and Europe
      - Haplogroup E1a (formerly E1) (M132) Primarily Africa
      - Haplogroup E1b (P177/PF1939)
        - Haplogroup E1b1 (formerly E3) (P2, DYS391p)
          - Haplogroup E1b1a (V38)
          - Haplogroup E1b1a1 (formerly E3a) (M2) West Africa, Central Africa, Southeast Africa and Southern Africa
          - Haplogroup E1b1b (formerly E3b) (M215) Horn of Africa (Ethiopians, Somalis, Eritrea), North Africa (Berbers, Arabs), the Middle East, Europe (esp. areas near the Mediterranean Sea)
    - Haplogroup E2 (M75) East Africa

=== Sources ===
- ISOGG:
  - Y-DNA Haplogroup Tree 2015
  - Y-DNA Haplogroup C and its Subclades - 2015
  - Y-DNA Haplogroup F and its Subclades - 2015

== See also ==
=== Genetics ===
- Human Y-chromosome DNA haplogroup
- Y-chromosome haplogroups in populations of the world
- Y-DNA haplogroups by ethnic group
- Y-DNA haplogroups in populations of East and Southeast Asia
- Y-DNA haplogroups in populations of Oceania

Y-DNA C subclades

- Mega-Haplogroup CF
- Mega-Haplogroup CT
- C-M130
- C-M208
- C-M210
- C-M216
- C-M217
- C-M38
- C-M8
- C-M93
- C-P33
- C-P44
