= Haplogroup D-M15 =

Human Y-chromosome DNA haplogroup

- Ancestor: D1a1
- Defining mutations: M15

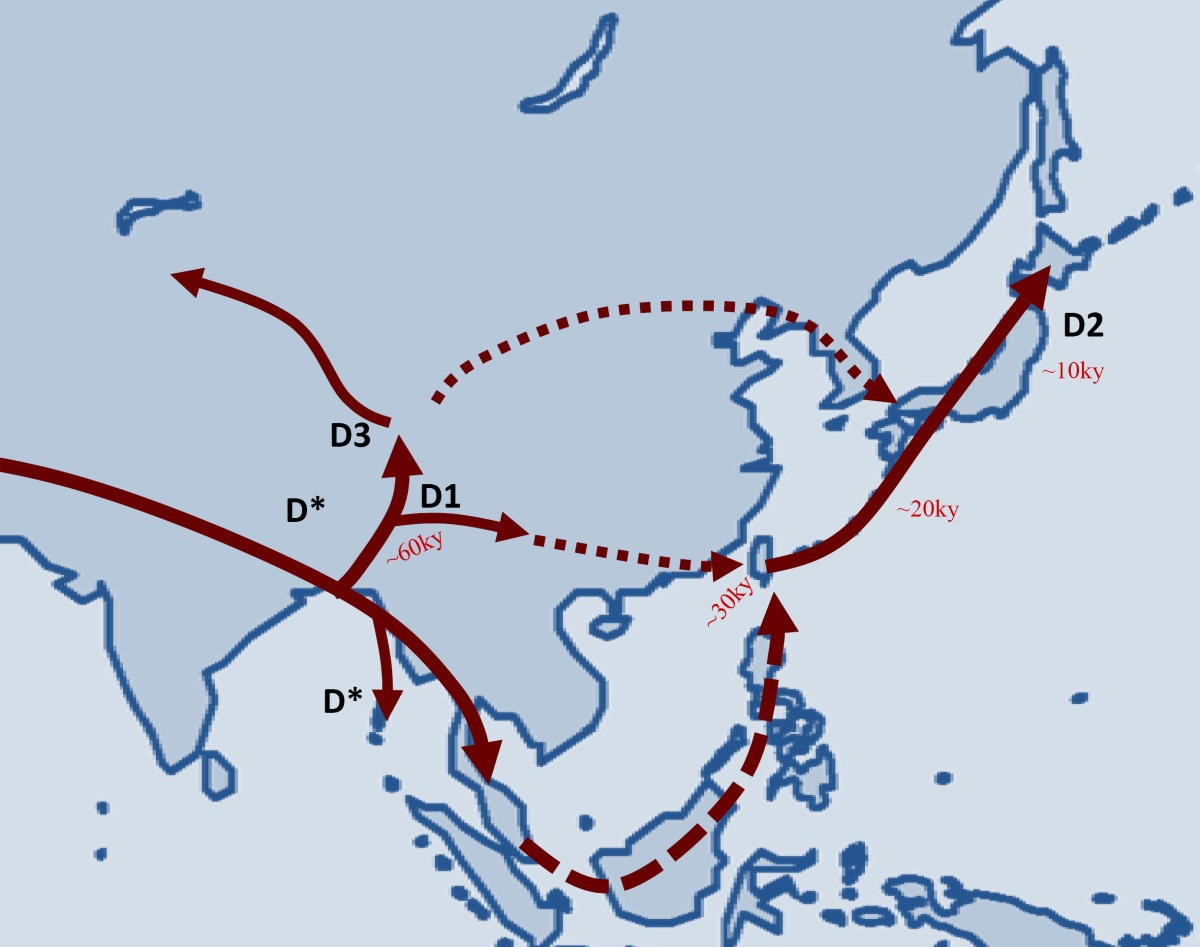
Likely migration route of haplogroup D in East Asia.

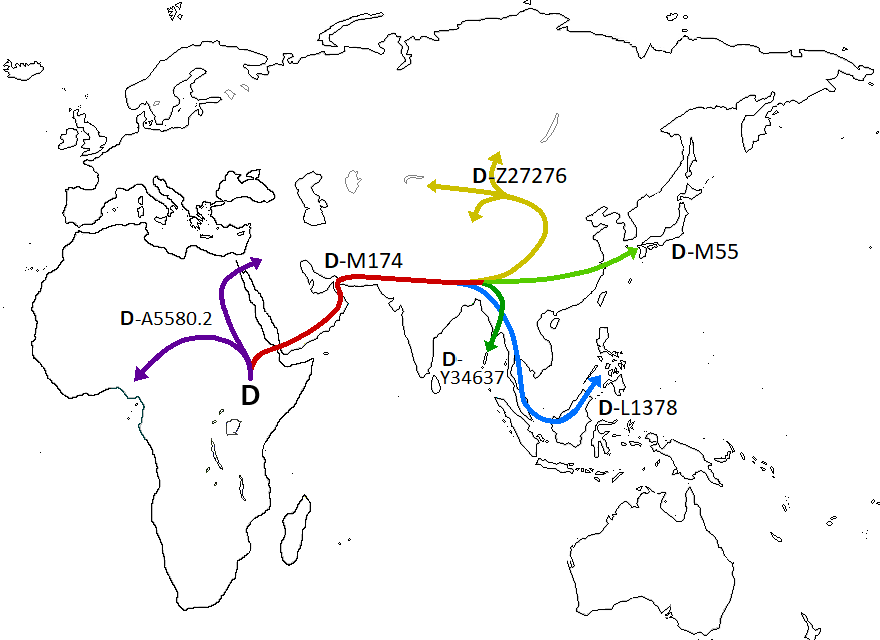
Possible migration route of haplogroup D, according to Haber et al. 2019.

Haplogroup D-M15 is a Y-chromosome haplogroup. Its phylogenetically closest relatives are found among the peoples of Japan, Central Asia, and the Andaman Islands in the Bay of Bengal. It is more distantly related to the haplogroup D*, whose sub-clades are common throughout Asia.

== Distribution ==
Haplogroup D-M15 is widely distributed throughout populations that dwell to the northwest, north, northeast, east, and southeast of the Himalaya. It is not found among the populations of India to the south and southwest. The distribution of haplogroup D1 in Southeast Asia is also very limited, as it is found there only at low frequency and only among populations that speak Tibeto-Burman or Hmong-Miao languages, which have ancestral ties to the north.

The distribution of haplogroup D-M15 is much more regular in the north, as it is found among nearly all the populations of Central Asia and Northeast Asia south of the Russian border, although generally at a low frequency of 2% or less. A dramatic spike in the frequency of haplogroup D-M15 occurs as one approaches the Qinghai-Tibetan Plateau of western China: among some local populations in Qinghai, it has been found to reach as high as 100%. Its frequency gradually fades as one travels south through the territory of the Tibetan peoples, as haplogroup O3, which is the most common haplogroup among the Hmong-Miao and also generally found among Southeast Asian populations, becomes dominant. Haplogroup D-M15 continues to occur at an overall very low frequency among the Han people to the east; however, there are some indications that the frequency of D-M15 among the Hans may vary significantly between localities.

As for the ultimate origin of haplogroup D-M15, one can only speculate that it might share a recent common ancestor with other members of the greater D-M174 lineage who have not tested as part of another branch. Such are found at a low frequency among modern populations of Central Asia.

== Phylogenetics ==
=== Phylogenetic history ===
Before 2002, there were in academic literature at least seven naming systems for the Y-Chromosome Phylogenetic tree. This led to considerable confusion. In 2002, the major research groups came together and formed the Y-Chromosome Consortium (YCC). They published a joint paper that created a single new tree that all agreed to use. Later, a group of citizen scientists with an interest in population genetics and genetic genealogy formed a working group to create an amateur tree aiming at being above all timely. The table below brings together all of these works at the point of the landmark 2002 YCC Tree. This allows a researcher reviewing older published literature to quickly move between nomenclatures.

YCC 2002/2008 (Shorthand)	(α)	(β)	(γ)	(δ)	(ε)	(ζ)	(η)	YCC 2002 (Longhand)	YCC 2005 (Longhand)	YCC 2008 (Longhand)	YCC 2010r (Longhand)	ISOGG 2006	ISOGG 2007	ISOGG 2008	ISOGG 2009	ISOGG 2010	ISOGG 2011	ISOGG 2012
D-M174	*	*	*	*	*	*	*	*	D	D	D	D	D	D	D	D	D	D
D-M15	4	IV	3G	12	Eu5	H3	B	D1	D1	D1	D1	D1	D1	D1	D1	D1	D1	D1
D-M55	*	*	*	*	*	*	*	*	D2	D2	D2	D2	D2	D2	D2	D2	D2	D2
D-P12	4	IV	3G	11	Eu5	H2	B	D2a	D2a	D2a1a1	D2a1a1	D2	D2	D2a1a1	D2a1a1	D2a1a1	removed	removed
D-M116.1	4	IV	3G	11	Eu5	H2	B	D2b*	D2a	D2a	D2a	D2a	D2a	D2a	D2a	D2a	removed	removed
D-M125	4	IV	3G	11	Eu5	H2	B	D2b1	D2a1	D2a1	D2a1	D2a1	D2a1	D2a1	D2a1	D2a1	D2a1	D2a1
D-M151	4	IV	3G	11	Eu5	H2	B	D2b2	D2a1	D2a2	D2a2	D2a2	D2a2	D2a2	D2a2	D2a2	D2a2	D2a2

==== Research publications ====
The following research teams per their publications were represented in the creation of the YCC tree.

- α Jobling and Tyler-Smith 2000 and Kaladjieva 2001
- β Underhill 2000
- γ Hammer 2001
- δ Karafet 2001
- ε Semino 2000
- ζ Su 1999
- η Capelli 2001

=== Phylogenetic trees ===
By ISOGG tree (Version: 14.151).

- DE (YAP)
  - D (CTS3946)
    - D1 (M174/Page30, IMS-JST021355, M174)
      - D1a (CTS11577)
        - D1a1 (F6251/Z27276)
          - D1a1a (M15) Tibet
          - D1a1b (P99) Tibet, Mongol, Central Asia
        - D1a2 (M64.1/Page44.1, M55) Japan (Yamato people, Ryukyuan people, Ainu people)
        - D1a3 (Y34637) Andaman Islands (Onge people, Jarawa people)
      - D1b (L1378) Philippines
    - D2 (A5580.2) Nigeria, Saudi Arabia, Syria

== See also ==
=== Genetics ===
- African admixture in Europe
- Genetic genealogy
- Haplogroup
- Haplotype
- Human Y-chromosome DNA haplogroup
- Molecular phylogenetics
- Paragroup
- Subclade
- Y-chromosome haplogroups in populations of the world
- Y-DNA haplogroups by ethnic group
- Y-DNA haplogroups in populations of East and Southeast Asia
- Y-DNA haplogroups in populations of Oceania

=== Y-DNA D subclades ===
- Haplogroup DE
- D-M116.1
- D-M125
- D-M15
- D-M151
- D-M174
- D-M55
- D-P12
