= Haplogroup F =

Haplogroup F may refer to:

- Haplogroup F (mtDNA), a human mitochondrial DNA (mtDNA) haplogroup
- Haplogroup F* (Y-DNA), a human Y-chromosome (Y-DNA) haplogroup
