= D1a =

D1a may refer to:

- Aichi D1A, a Japanese bomber plane
- Haplogroup D1a, a Y-DNA haplogroup most prevalent in Japanese, Ainu, and Andamanese
