= Haplogroup D =

Haplogroup D may refer to:

- Haplogroup D (mtDNA), a human mitochondrial DNA (mtDNA) haplogroup
- Haplogroup D (Y-DNA), a human Y-chromosome (Y-DNA) haplogroup
