= Haplogroup E-M96 =

Human Y chromosome DNA grouping indicating common ancestry

Haplogroup E
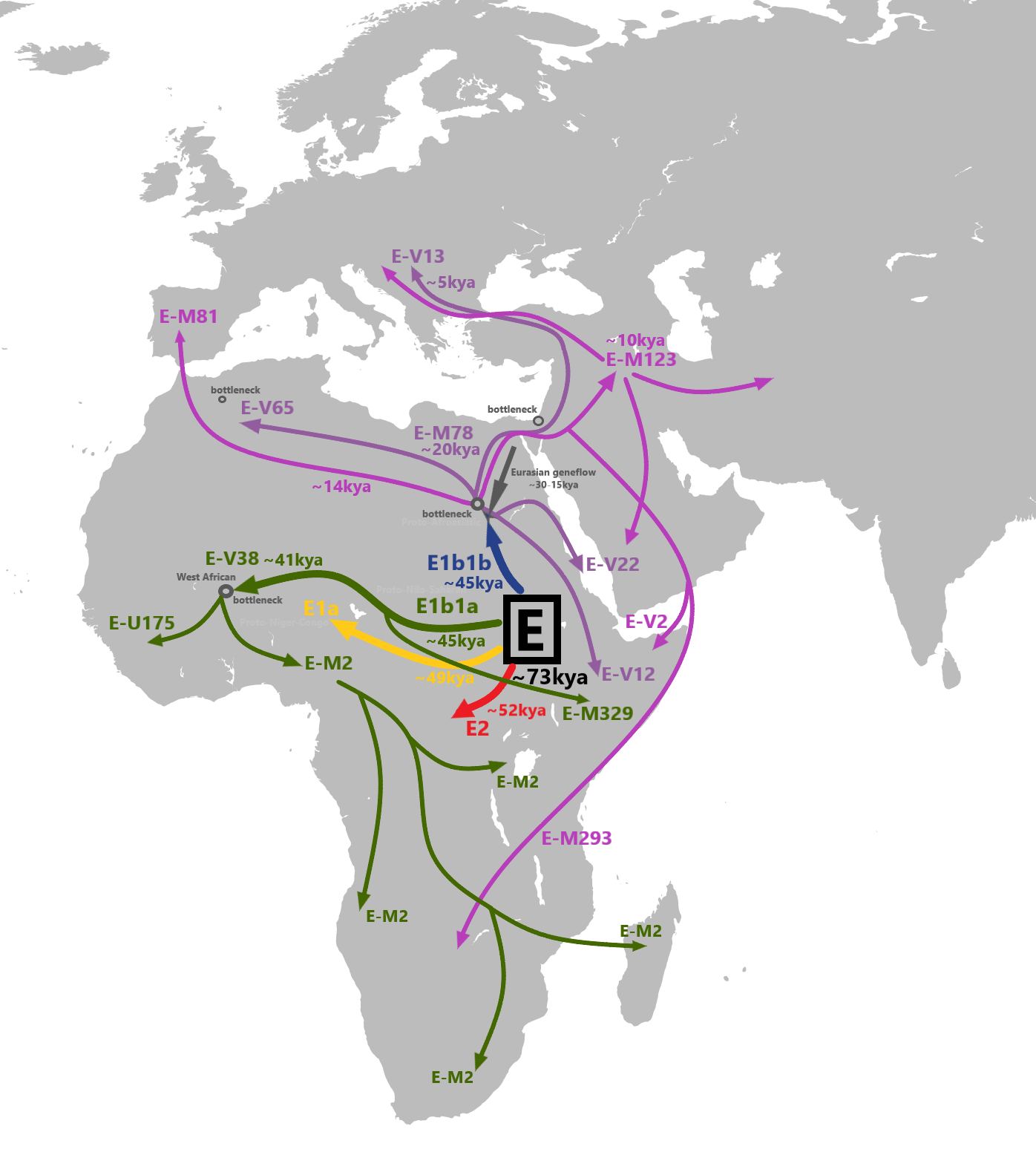
- Possible time of origin: 65,200 years BP, 69,000 years BP, or 73,000 years BP
- Coalescence age: 52,300 years BP
- Possible place of origin: East Africa, West Africa, or Eurasia
- Ancestor: DE
- Descendants: E-P147, E-M75
- Defining mutations: L339, L614, M40/SRY4064/SRY8299, M96, P29, P150, P152, P154, P155, P156, P162, P168, P169, P170, P171, P172, P173, P174, P175, P176

Haplogroup E-M96 is a human Y-chromosome DNA haplogroup. It is one of the two main branches of the older and ancestral haplogroup DE, the other main branch being haplogroup D. The E-M96 clade is divided into two main subclades: the more common E-P147, and the less common E-M75.

== Origins ==
Underhill (2001) proposed that haplogroup E may have arisen in East Africa. Some authors as Chandrasekar (2007), accept the earlier position of Hammer (1997) that Haplogroup E may have originated in West Asia, given that:

- E is a clade of haplogroup DE, with the other major clade, haplogroup D, being exclusively distributed in Asia.
- DE is a clade within M168 with the other two major clades, C and F, considered to have already a Eurasian origin.

However, several discoveries made since the Hammer articles are thought to make an Asian origin less likely:

1. Underhill and Kivisild (2007) demonstrated that C and F have a common ancestor meaning that DE has only one sibling which is non-African.
2. DE* is found in both Asia and Africa, meaning that not only one, but several siblings of D are found in Asia and Africa.
3. Karafet (2008), in which Hammer is a co-author, significantly rearranged time estimates leading to "new interpretations on the geographical origin of ancient sub-clades". Amongst other things this article proposed a much older age for haplogroup E-M96 than had been considered previously, giving it a similar age to Haplogroup D, and DE itself, meaning that there is no longer any strong reason to see it as an offshoot of DE which must have happened long after DE came into existence and had entered Asia.

Kohl et al. (2009) presumed a West African origin for haplogroup E, stating: "From the 20 main haplogroups in the Y-chromosomal haplogroup tree, only 5 were detected in the analysed Amharic population in Ethiopia. Haplogroup A is near the roots of the tree and is only found among males on the African continent. The major haplogroup detected was E. Haplogroup E has its origin in West Africa. Due to immigration haplogroup A, which originally dominated in Ethiopia, has been partly replaced."

In 2015, Poznik & Underhill et al. claimed haplogroup E arose outside Africa, arguing that, "This model of geographical segregation within the CT clade requires just one continental haplogroup exchange (E to Africa), rather than three (D, C, and F out of Africa). The timing of this putative return to Africa, between the emergence of haplogroup E and its differentiation within Africa by 58 kya, is consistent with proposals, based on non–Y chromosome data, of abundant gene flow between Africa and Arabia 50–80 kya."

In 2015, Trobetta et al. suggested an East African origin for haplogroup E, stating: "our phylogeographic analysis, based on thousands of samples worldwide, suggests that the radiation of haplogroup E started about 58 ka, somewhere in sub-Saharan Africa, with a higher posterior probability (0.73) for an eastern African origin."

Cabrera et al. (2018) hypothesizes a Eurasian center of origin and dispersal for haplogroup E based on the similar age of the clade's parent haplogroup DE and the mtDNA haplogroup L3. According to this hypothesis, after an initial Out-of-Africa migration of early anatomically modern humans around 125 kya, haplogroup DE diversified around the Himalayas and in or westward of the Tibet, after which E-carrying males are proposed to have back-migrated from the paternal haplogroup's place of origin in Eurasia around 70 kya along with females bearing the maternal haplogroup L3, which the study also hypothesizes to have originated in Eurasia, into Africa. These new Eurasian lineages were then suggested to have largely replaced the old autochthonous male (such as haplogroup B-M60) and female African lineages.

Haber et al. (2019) study proposed an African origin for haplogroup E based on an analysis of the Y-chromosomal phylogenetic structure, haplogroup divergence times, and the recently discovered haplogroup D0 found in three Nigerians, an additional branch of the DE lineage diverging early from haplogroup D. The authors support an African origin for haplogroup DE, and the immigration of haplogroups C, D and FT out of Africa around 50,300–81,000 ybp. The early divergence dates found in the study for DE, E, and D0 (all dated to about 71-76 kya), which are determined to predate the migration out-of-Africa of the ancestors of Eurasians (dated to ca. 50-60 kya), are also considered by the authors to support an African origin for those haplogroups.

== Ancient DNA ==
Pre-Pottery Neolithic B remains from the Levant were found to have carried haplogroup E (1/7; ~14%).

At Nyarindi Rockshelter, in Kenya, there were two individuals, dated to the Later Stone Age (3500 BP); one carried haplogroup L4b2a and another carried haplogroup E (E-M96, E-P162).

At Kindoki, in the Democratic Republic of Congo, there were three individuals, dated to the protohistoric period (230 BP, 150 BP, 230 BP); one carried haplogroups E1b1a1a1d1a2 (E-CTS99, E-CTS99) and L1c3a1b, another carried haplogroup E (E-M96, E-PF1620), and the last carried haplogroups R1b1 (R-P25 1, R-M415) and L0a1b1a1.

== Distribution ==
Most members of haplogroup E-M96 belong to E1, while haplogroup E2-M75 is rare. Haplogroup E1a is split into two main branches: E1a1 (E-M44) which has been mostly found in Europe, West Asia and among Ashkenazi Jews; and E1a2 (E-Z958) which has been exclusively identified in Sub-Saharan Africa. Haplogroup E-M2 is the most prevalent subclade of E in Sub-Saharan Africa and is strongly associated with expansion of Bantu speakers.

E-M215 is found at high frequencies in North Africa, West Asia, East Africa and Europe. E-M215 is most common among Afro-Asiatic speakers in the Near East, North Africa and the Horn of Africa, and it has also been reported among some Nilo-Saharan and Niger–Congo speakers in North East Africa and Sudan. E-M215 is far less common in West, Central, and Southern Africa, though it has been observed among some Khoisan speakers and among Niger–Congo speakers in Senegambia, Guinea-Bissau, Burkina Faso, Ghana, Gabon, the Democratic Republic of the Congo, Rwanda, Namibia, and South Africa.

== Subclades ==
=== E-M96* ===
Paragroup E-M96* refers to lineages belonging to the E clade but which cannot be classified into any known branch. E(xE1-P147, E2-M75) - that is, E which has tested negative for both P147 and M75 - has been reported in 3 males from Lebanon, 2 Amharas from Ethiopia, 2 males from Syria, 2 males from Saudi Arabia, and in a single Bantu-speaking male from South Africa. E(xE1a-M33, E1b1-P2, E2-M75) was reported among several Southern African populations and in an Egyptian man; E(xE1a-M33, E1b1a1-M2, E1b1b-M215, E2-M75) has also been observed amongst pygmies and Bantu from Cameroon and Gabon; and also in Burkina Faso and a Fulbe man from Niger.

Recently it was discovered that 3 East African men previously classified only as E*-M96 could be assigned to a new branch, E-V44, which is a sister branch to E1-P147; E-P147 and E-V44 share the V3725 mutation, making E2-M75 and E-V3725 the two known primary branches of E. Two Saudi private testers from Mecca and Jizan were also found to belong to this elusive and rare branch. It is not known whether or not some (or all) other E*(xE1,E2) in previous studies would fall into V44 as well.

=== E-P147 ===
E-P147 (also known as E1) is by far the most numerous and widely distributed branch of E-M96. It has two primary branches: E-M132 (E1a) and E-P177 (E1b). Haplogroup E1a is split into two branches: E1a1 (E-M44) which has been mostly found in Europe, West Asia and among Ashkenazi Jews; and E1a2 (E-Z958) which has been exclusively identified in Sub-Saharan Africa.

Haplogroup E-P2 (E1b1) is the most frequent variant of E-M96 and the most common Y-DNA lineage in Africa with two main descendants: E-V38 (E1b1a) and E-M215 (E1b1b). Haplogroup E (xE3b,E3a) - that is, E tested negative for both M35 and M2, has been reported in 11 males from Morocco in Zalloua et al. (2008b).

Haplogroup E-V38 is the ancestor of E-M2 (E1b1a1) which is the most common subclade of E in the entirety of Sub-Saharan Africa, and is strongly associated with the expansion of Bantu speakers throughout Central and Southern Africa. Another descendant of E-V38, E-M329 (E1b1a2), has been observed in an Ethiopian hunter-gatherer from 4,200 ybp, and is mostly found in males from the Horn of Africa and Arabian Peninsula.

On the other hand, haplogroup E-M215 (E1b1b) is distributed in high frequencies throughout North Africa, Western Asia, East Africa and Europe. Haplogroup E-Z827 was found in Natufian samples (E-Z830+) dated to 10,000 ybp from Palestine, and is commonly found throughout West Asia, North Africa, Europe and Ethiopia. Haplogroup E-V68 is also commonly observed in North Africa and West Asia, and has been found in Iberomaurusian remains dating to 15,000 ybp from Morocco, with its prolific downstream descendant E-V32 dominating male lineages in Horn of Africa.

=== E-M75 ===
E-M75 (also known as E2) is present throughout Subequatorial Africa, particularly in the African Great Lakes and Central Africa. The highest concentration of the haplogroup has been found among the Alur (66.67%), Hema (38.89%), Rimaibe (27.03%), Mbuti (25.00%), Daba (22.22%), Eviya (20.83%), Zulu (20.69%), and Kenyan Bantus (17.24%).

Haplogroup E-M75(xM41,M54) has been found in 6% (1/18) of Dama from Namibia, 4% (1/26) of Ganda from Uganda, 3% (1/39) of Mandinka from Gambia/Senegal, and 2% (1/49) of Sena from Mozambique .

Private commercial DNA testing at Family Tree DNA shows numerous E-M75 males originating from the Arabian Peninsula (Saudi Arabia, Bahrain, Kuwait, Yemen, and the United Arab Emirates), and among Ashkenazi Jews. E-M75 has also been identified in a Lebanese male.

== Phylogenetics ==
=== Phylogenetic history ===
Prior to 2002, there were in academic literature at least seven naming systems for the Y-Chromosome Phylogenetic tree. This led to considerable confusion. In 2002, the major research groups came together and formed the Y-Chromosome Consortium (YCC). They published a joint paper that created a single new tree that all agreed to use. Later, a group of citizen scientists with an interest in population genetics and genetic genealogy formed a working group to create an amateur tree aiming at being above all timely. The table below brings together all of these works at the point of the landmark 2002 YCC Tree. This allows a researcher reviewing older published literature to quickly move between nomenclatures.

YCC 2002/2008 (Shorthand)	(α)	(β)	(γ)	(δ)	(ε)	(ζ)	(η)	YCC 2002 (Longhand)	YCC 2005 (Longhand)	YCC 2008 (Longhand)	YCC 2010r (Longhand)	ISOGG 2006	ISOGG 2007	ISOGG 2008	ISOGG 2009	ISOGG 2010	ISOGG 2011	ISOGG 2012
E-P29	21	III	3A	13	Eu3	H2	B	E*	E	E	E	E	E	E	E	E	E	E
E-M33	21	III	3A	13	Eu3	H2	B	E1*	E1	E1a	E1a	E1	E1	E1a	E1a	E1a	E1a	E1a
E-M44	21	III	3A	13	Eu3	H2	B	E1a	E1a	E1a1	E1a1	E1a	E1a	E1a1	E1a1	E1a1	E1a1	E1a1
E-M75	21	III	3A	13	Eu3	H2	B	E2a	E2	E2	E2	E2	E2	E2	E2	E2	E2	E2
E-M54	21	III	3A	13	Eu3	H2	B	E2b	E2b	E2b	E2b1	-	-	-	-	-	-	-
E-P2	25	III	4	14	Eu3	H2	B	E3*	E3	E1b	E1b1	E3	E3	E1b1	E1b1	E1b1	E1b1	E1b1
E-M2	8	III	5	15	Eu2	H2	B	E3a*	E3a	E1b1	E1b1a	E3a	E3a	E1b1a	E1b1a	E1b1a	E1b1a1	E1b1a1
E-M58	8	III	5	15	Eu2	H2	B	E3a1	E3a1	E1b1a1	E1b1a1	E3a1	E3a1	E1b1a1	E1b1a1	E1b1a1	E1b1a1a1a	E1b1a1a1a
E-M116.2	8	III	5	15	Eu2	H2	B	E3a2	E3a2	E1b1a2	E1b1a2	E3a2	E3a2	E1b1a2	E1b1a2	E1ba12	removed	removed
E-M149	8	III	5	15	Eu2	H2	B	E3a3	E3a3	E1b1a3	E1b1a3	E3a3	E3a3	E1b1a3	E1b1a3	E1b1a3	E1b1a1a1c	E1b1a1a1c
E-M154	8	III	5	15	Eu2	H2	B	E3a4	E3a4	E1b1a4	E1b1a4	E3a4	E3a4	E1b1a4	E1b1a4	E1b1a4	E1b1a1a1g1c	E1b1a1a1g1c
E-M155	8	III	5	15	Eu2	H2	B	E3a5	E3a5	E1b1a5	E1b1a5	E3a5	E3a5	E1b1a5	E1b1a5	E1b1a5	E1b1a1a1d	E1b1a1a1d
E-M10	8	III	5	15	Eu2	H2	B	E3a6	E3a6	E1b1a6	E1b1a6	E3a6	E3a6	E1b1a6	E1b1a6	E1b1a6	E1b1a1a1e	E1b1a1a1e
E-M35	25	III	4	14	Eu4	H2	B	E3b*	E3b	E1b1b1	E1b1b1	E3b1	E3b1	E1b1b1	E1b1b1	E1b1b1	removed	removed
E-M78	25	III	4	14	Eu4	H2	B	E3b1*	E3b1	E1b1b1a	E1b1b1a1	E3b1a	E3b1a	E1b1b1a	E1b1b1a	E1b1b1a	E1b1b1a1	E1b1b1a1
E-M148	25	III	4	14	Eu4	H2	B	E3b1a	E3b1a	E1b1b1a3a	E1b1b1a1c1	E3b1a3a	E3b1a3a	E1b1b1a3a	E1b1b1a3a	E1b1b1a3a	E1b1b1a1c1	E1b1b1a1c1
E-M81	25	III	4	14	Eu4	H2	B	E3b2*	E3b2	E1b1b1b	E1b1b1b1	E3b1b	E3b1b	E1b1b1b	E1b1b1b	E1b1b1b	E1b1b1b1	E1b1b1b1a
E-M107	25	III	4	14	Eu4	H2	B	E3b2a	E3b2a	E1b1b1b1	E1b1b1b1a	E3b1b1	E3b1b1	E1b1b1b1	E1b1b1b1	E1b1b1b1	E1b1b1b1a	E1b1b1b1a1
E-M165	25	III	4	14	Eu4	H2	B	E3b2b	E3b2b	E1b1b1b2	E1b1b1b1b1	E3b1b2	E3b1b2	E1b1b1b2a	E1b1b1b2a	E1b1b1b2a	E1b1b1b2a	E1b1b1b1a2a
E-M123	25	III	4	14	Eu4	H2	B	E3b3*	E3b3	E1b1b1c	E1b1b1c	E3b1c	E3b1c	E1b1b1c	E1b1b1c	E1b1b1c	E1b1b1c	E1b1b1b2a
E-M34	25	III	4	14	Eu4	H2	B	E3b3a*	E3b3a	E1b1b1c1	E1b1b1c1	E3b1c1	E3b1c1	E1b1b1c1	E1b1b1c1	E1b1b1c1	E1b1b1c1	E1b1b1b2a1
E-M136	25	III	4	14	Eu4	H2	B	E3b3a1	E3b3a1	E1b1b1c1a	E1b1b1c1a1	E3b1c1a	E3b1c1a	E1b1b1c1a1	E1b1b1c1a1	E1b1b1c1a1	E1b1b1c1a1	E1b1b1b2a1a1

==== Research publications ====
The following research teams per their publications were represented in the creation of the YCC tree.

- α Jobling and Tyler-Smith 2000 and Kaladjieva 2001
- β Underhill 2000
- γ Hammer 2001
- δ Karafet 2001
- ε Semino 2000
- ζ Su 1999
- η Capelli 2001

=== Phylogenetic trees ===
This phylogenetic tree of haplogroup subclades is based on the Y-Chromosome Consortium (YCC) Tree, the ISOGG Y-DNA Haplogroup Tree, and subsequent published research.

- E (M96)
  - E1 (P147)
    - E1a (M132)
    - E1b1 (P2)
      - E1b1a (V38)
        - E1b1a1 (M2)
        - E1b1a2 (M329)
      - E1b1b (M215)
        - E1b1b1a (V68)
        - E1b1b1b (Z827)
  - E2 (M75)

== See also ==
=== Genetics ===
- African admixture in Europe
- Genetic genealogy
- Haplogroup D
- Haplogroup DE
- Haplogroup
- Haplotype
- Human Y-chromosome DNA haplogroup
- Molecular phylogenetics
- Paragroup
- Subclade
- Y-chromosome haplogroups in populations of the world
- Y-DNA haplogroups by ethnic group
- Y-DNA haplogroups in populations of Sub-Saharan Africa

=== Y-DNA E subclades ===
- Haplogroup E-L485
- Haplogroup E-M123
- Haplogroup E-M180
- Haplogroup E-M215
- Haplogroup E-M33
- Haplogroup E-M521
- Haplogroup E-M75
- Haplogroup E-M96
- Haplogroup E-P147
- Haplogroup E-P177
- Haplogroup E-P2
- Haplogroup E-V12
- Haplogroup E-V13
- Haplogroup E-V22
- Haplogroup E-V38
- Haplogroup E-M2
- Haplogroup E-V65
- Haplogroup E-V68
- Haplogroup E-Z820
- Haplogroup E-Z827
