= Haplogroup GHIJK =

Human Y-chromosome DNA haplogroup

- Possible time of origin: Approx. 55,800 years BP
- Coalescence age: 53,800-55,300 years ago
- Possible place of origin: South Asia, or Southeast Asia
- Ancestor: F (F-M89)
- Descendants: G, HIJK
- Defining mutations: M3658/F1329/PF2622/YSC0001299, CTS2254/M3680/PF2657, FGC2045/Z12203

Haplogroup GHIJK, defined by the SNPs M3658, F1329, PF2622, and YSC0001299, is a common Y-chromosome haplogroup. This macrohaplogroup and its subclades contain the vast majority of the world's existing male population.

== Phylogeny ==
GHIJK is the major clade of Haplogroup F (F-M89). It branches subsequently into two direct descendants: Haplogroup G (M201/PF2957) and Haplogroup HIJK (F929/M578/PF3494/S6397). The other haplotypes of Haplogroup F are F1, F2, and F3.

Subclades of GHIJK, under the HIJK lineage, include: H (L901/M2939) and IJK (F-L15). The downstream descendants of Haplogroup IJK include the major haplogroups I, J, K, L, M, N, O, P, Q, R, S and T.

== Distribution ==
The basal paragroup GHIJK* has not been identified in living males or ancient remains.

Populations with high proportions of descendant haplogroups were predominant, before the modern era, in males across widely-dispersed areas and populations. These include:

- the Caucasus and West Asia (e. g. haplogroups G, J, and R);
- South Asia (e. g. haplogroups H, J, L, and R);
- Europe (e. g. haplogroups G, I, J, Q, R and N);
- East Asia, Southeast Asia and Oceania (e.g. haplogroups K, M, N, P, O, S)
- Central Asia (e. g. haplogroups J, P, Q, and R) and;
- most Native American peoples (e. g. haplogroup Q, C and R)

== See also ==
=== Genetics ===
- Conversion table for Y chromosome haplogroups
- Genetic genealogy
- Genetic history of the Middle East
- Haplogroup
- Haplotype
- Human Y-chromosome DNA haplogroup
- Molecular phylogenetics
- Paragroup
- Subclade
- Y-chromosomal Aaron
- Y-chromosome haplogroups in populations of the world
- Y-DNA haplogroups by ethnic group
- Y-DNA haplogroups in populations of South Asia
