= Haplogroup D-CTS3946 =

Human Y-chromosome DNA haplogroup

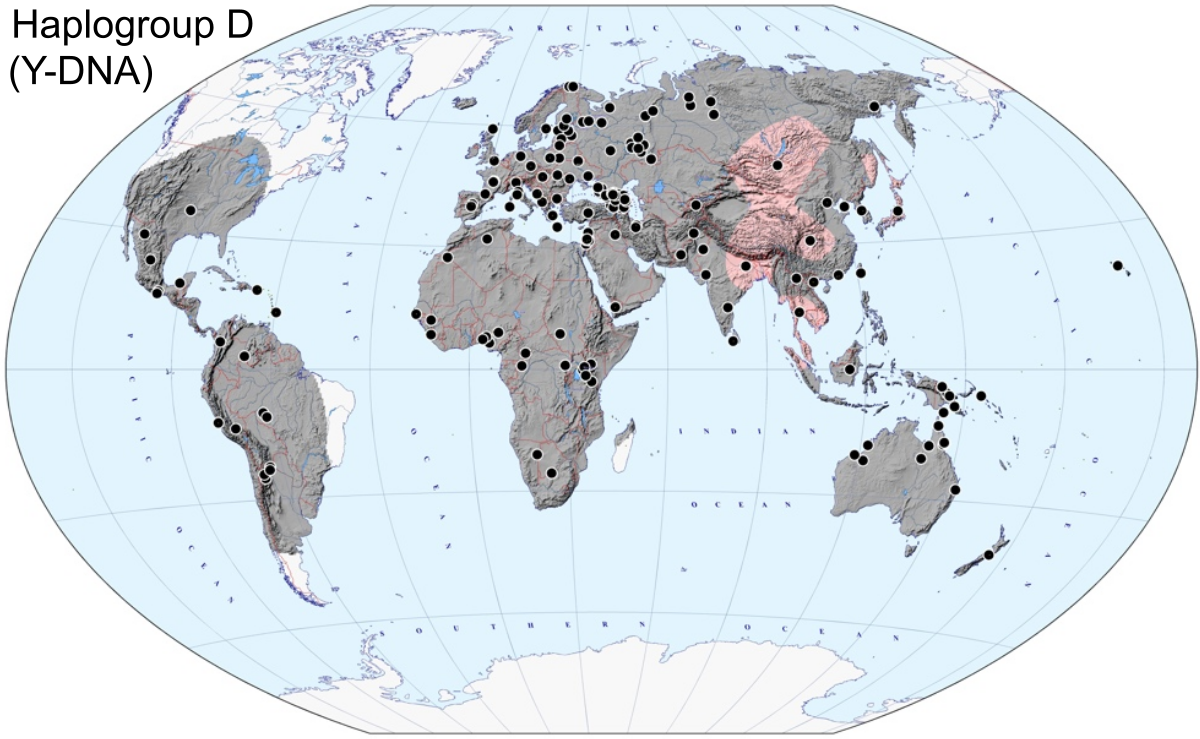
- Possible time of origin: 72,700 BP (80,700–64,700 BP)
- Possible place of origin: East Africa
- Ancestor: DE
- Descendants: D-M174 (also known as D1); D-A5580.2 (also known as D2 and D0)
- Defining mutations: CTS3946, CTS4030/Z1605

Haplogroup D, also known as D-CTS3946, is a Y-chromosome haplogroup. Like its relative distant sibling, haplogroup E-M96, D-CTS3946 has the YAP+ unique-event polymorphism, which defines their parent, haplogroup DE. D-CTS3946 has two basal branches, D1 and D2. D1 and D2 are found primarily in East Asia, at low frequency in Central Asia and Southeast Asia, and at very low frequency in Western Africa and Western Asia.

== Origins ==
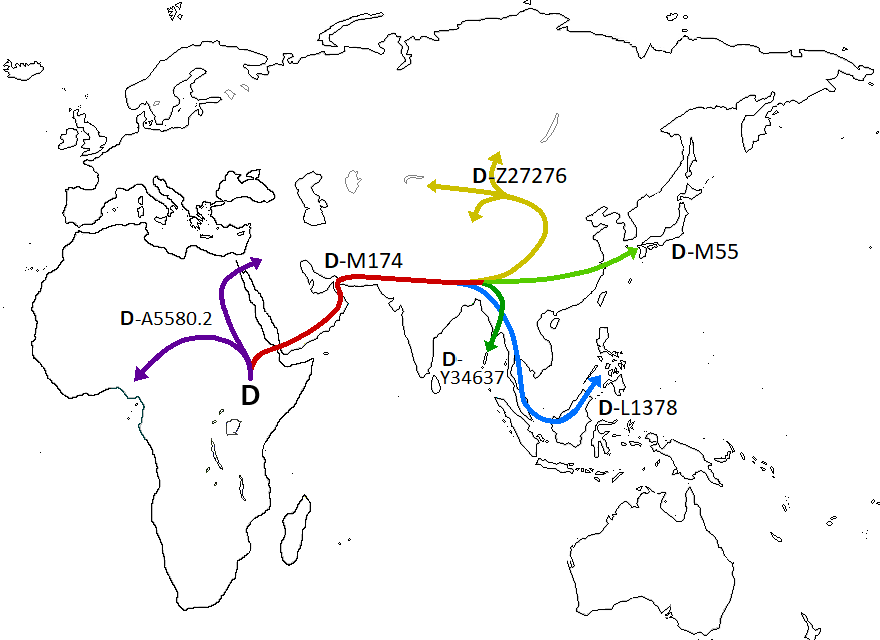
Proposed migration of haplogroup D according to Haber et al. (2019)

Haplogroup D was formerly the name of the D lineage D-M174. Varying proposals exist regarding the origin of haplogroup DE, the parent of D, with some suggesting an African and others an Asian origin. But D-M174 was, and generally is, assumed to be of Asian origin and is exclusively found in Asia.

Haber et al. (2019) identified a haplogroup, termed "D0", in three Nigerians. Defined by the SNP A5580.2, "D0" haplogroup is outside M174, but belongs to the D lineage, shares 7 SNPs with it D-M174 that E lacks, and was determined to have diverged early from the D branch (near the D/E split). Haber et al. (2019) considered several possibilities, including an African origin and Asian origin for the haplogroup, but in part because of the deep-rooting of haplogroup "D0", as well as recently calculated early divergence times for it and its parent haplogroup, DE, the authors conclude in favor of an African origin for D0 and DE, as well as for the common ancestor (now known as D-CTS3946 or "D") of D0 and D-M174. According to Haber et al. (2019), D0 is a branch of the DE lineage near the D/E split but on the D branch, diverging around 71,000 years ago. The authors find divergence times for DE*, E, and D0, all likely within a period of about 71,000–76,000 years ago, and a likely date for the exit of the ancestors of modern Eurasians out of Africa (and ensuing Neanderthal admixture) later, at around 50,300–59,400 years ago, which they argue, also supports an African origin for those haplogroups. Thus D-CTS3946 is proposed to have spread both within and outside of Africa: with one branch diverging into D0 in Africa, and another branch that left Africa eventually diverging into D-M174 (i.e. with the M174 mutation later arising from the D-CTS3946 that had spread to Asia).

Hallast et al. (2020), on ancient and modern haplogroups using a phylogenetic analysis of haplogroup C, D and FT sequences, including very rare deep-rooting lineages (such as D0/D2 sampled by Haber et al. 2019) argues, taking the "rare deep-rooted D0" into account, that the initial splits within haplogroup CT (ancestor of DE) occurred in Africa. They also argue that phylogeographic analyses of ancient and present-day non-African Y chromosomes, all point to East/Southeast Asia as the origin 50,000–55,000 years ago of all known surviving non-African male lineages (apart from recent migrants) soon after an initial 55,000–70,000 year ago migration from Africa of basal haplogroup D and other basal Y-DNA lineages. They argue that these lineages then rapidly expanded across Eurasia, later diversified in Southeast Asia and then expanded westwards around 50,000–55,000 years ago, replacing other local lineages within Eurasia, and conclude that haplogroup D (as D-M174) then underwent rapid expansions within Eastern Eurasian populations and consists of 5 different branches which formed about 45,000 years ago. They find that, among modern populations, haplogroup D-M174 currently have their greatest levels of diversity in East and Southeast Asia.

== Distribution ==
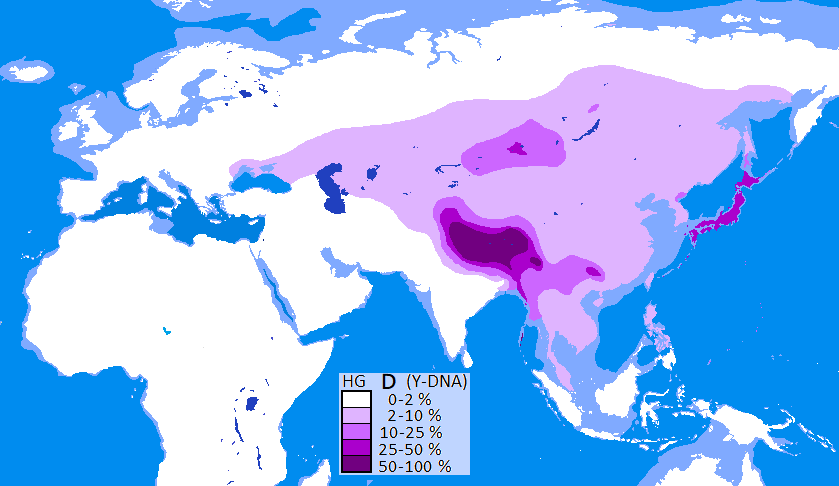
Frequency of Y Haplogroup D

Three other samples of D2 were also found (also in 2019) by FTDNA: two extremely closely related in Al Wajh on the west coast of Saudi Arabia and another one in a Syrian (he is D2b-FT51782). A D2b-FT51782 sample was also found in al-Qirbi from Bayda in Yemen that turned out to be several thousands of years related to that of the Syrian. There is another person (surname unknown) in the neighbouring Shabwah Governorate with TMRCA 1700 years BP with the first one. It was announced in 2020 by Michael Sager of FTDNA that another sample had been found in an African American and one in another African American. The samples found in the Syrian descendent and in one of the African Americans are to date the most basal samples of D2. The other African American sample shares a branch with the three Nigerians. The recent evidence (as also proposed by Haber et al.) suggests that D2 is a highly divergent haplogroup close to the DE split but on the D branch and lacking the M174 mutation possessed by the other known D lineages (belonging to its sibling D-M174).

== Subclades ==
=== D1 ===
Haplogroup D1 is a subclade of haplogroup D-CTS3946.

=== D2 ===
Haplogroup D2 is an Upper Paleolithic subclade of haplogroup D-CTS3946. D0 has been renamed D2, and D-M174 has been renamed D1 due to this discovery.

== Phylogenetic tree ==
By ISOGG tree (Version: 14.151).

- DE (YAP) Caribbean, Guinea-Bissau, Tibet, Nigeria
  - D (CTS3946)
    - D1 (M174/Page30, IMS-JST021355)
      - D1a (CTS11577)
        - D1a1 (F6251/Z27276)
          - D1a1a (M15) China (especially Miao, Yi, Tibetans, etc.), Southeast Asia, Mongolia, Central Asia
            - D1a1a1 (F849)
              - D1a1a1a (N1)
                - D1a1a1a1 (Z27269) Japan, China (particularly Tibet)
                  - D1a1a1a1a (PH4979)
                    - D1a1a1a1a1 (BY15119/Z29428)
              - D1a1a1a2 (Z31591) Nepal (Tamang), Kazakhstan, China (Yi)
            - D1a1a2 (F1070) China, Thailand
          - D1a1b (P99) Found with high frequency in Tibet and occasionally in other parts of China, Mongolia, Central Asia, and Altai Republic
        - D1a2 (Z3660)
          - D1a2a (M64.1/Page44.1, M55) Japan
            - D1a2a1 (M116.1)
            - D1a2a2 (CTS131)
              - D1a2a2a (CTS220)
              - D1a2a2b (CTS68) Japan (Rebun Island)
          - D1a2b (Y34637) Andaman Islands
      - D1b (L1378) Philippines
    - D2 (A5580.2) Nigeria, Saudi Arabia, Syria, United States, Yemen
