= Haplogroup CF =

Human Y chromosome DNA grouping indicating common ancestry

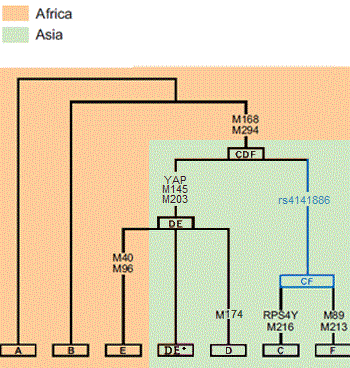
- Possible time of origin: 75,000–70,000 BP
- Possible place of origin: East Africa or Asia
- Ancestor: CT
- Descendants: C, F
- Defining mutations: P143

Haplogroup CF, also known as CF-P143 and CT(xDE), is a human Y-chromosome DNA haplogroup. CF is defined by the SNP P143, and its existence and distribution are inferred from the fact that haplogroups descended from CF include most human male lineages in Eurasia, Oceania, and the Americas. CF descends from CT (CT-M168), and is the sibling of DE. CF has two basal branches, haplogroup C and haplogroup F.

== Distribution ==
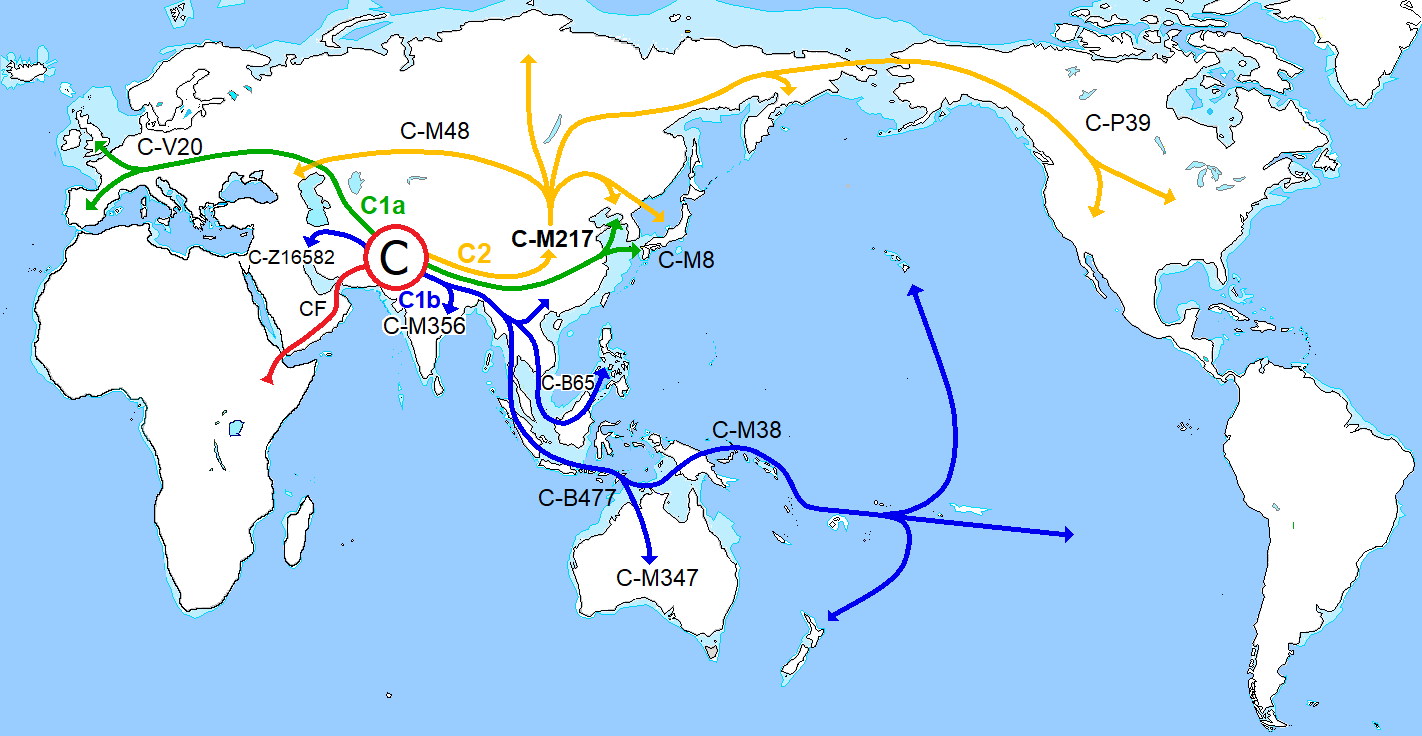
Migration of Haplogroup C.

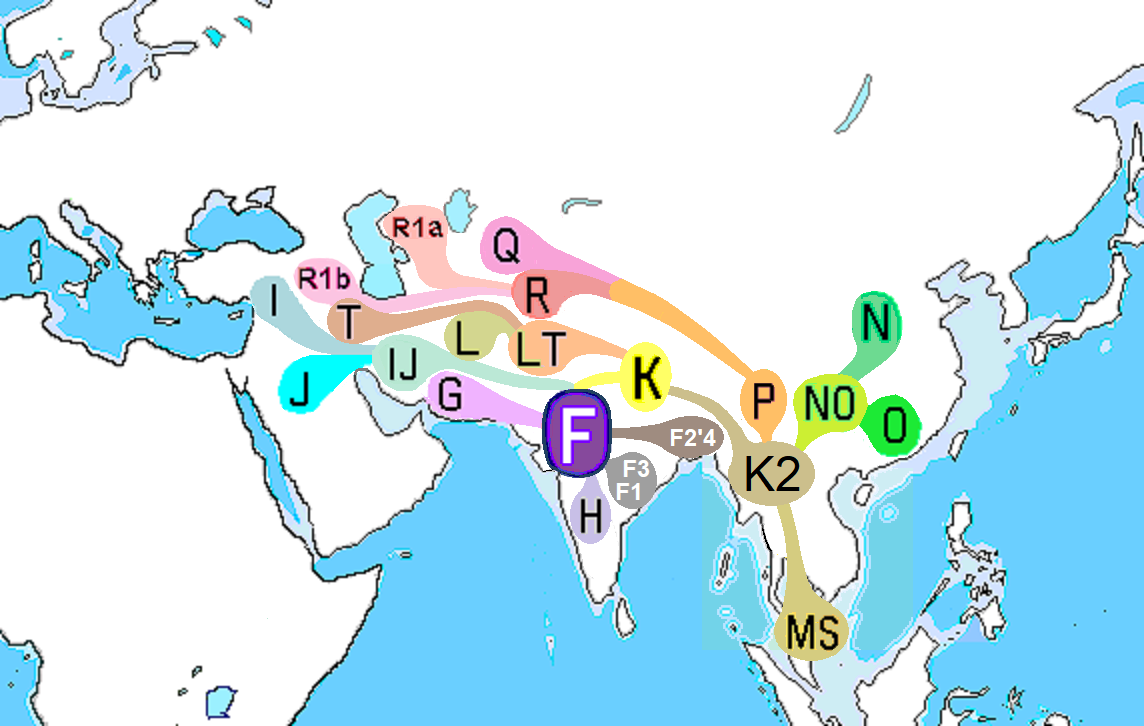
The geographical development and distribution of Haplogroup F.

There are, as yet, no confirmed cases of living individuals or human remains belonging to the basal, undivergent haplogroup CF*. In a 2017 study, C-M217 (C2) and C-M130 were reported among males belonging to the Shan peoples, who are concentrated in central-east Burma, as well as neighboring parts of Southeast and East Asia. However, the researchers involved (Brunelli et al.) did not rule out all other subclades of haplogroup CF, such as haplogroup F, in these particular cases. Haplogroup F2 has previously been identified in the same geographical region.

== Subclades ==
=== C ===
Haplogroup C is a subclade of haplogroup CF.

=== F ===
Haplogroup F is a subclade of haplogroup CF.

== See also ==
=== Genetics ===
- Genetic genealogy
- Haplogroup
- Haplotype
- Human Y-chromosome DNA haplogroup
- Molecular phylogenetics
- Paragroup
- Subclade
- Y-chromosome haplogroups in populations of the world
- Y-DNA haplogroups by ethnic group
- Y-DNA haplogroups in populations of East and Southeast Asia
- Y-DNA haplogroups in populations of Oceania

=== Y-DNA C subclades ===
- Mega-Haplogroup CF
- Mega-Haplogroup CT
- C-M130
- C-M208
- C-M210
- C-M216
- C-M217
- C-M38
- C-M8
- C-M93
- C-P33
- C-P44
