= Haplogroup D-Z27276 =

Human Y-chromosome DNA haplogroup

- Possible time of origin: 30,000–40,000 YBP
- Possible place of origin: East Asia
- Ancestor: D-M174
- Descendants: D-M15, D-P99
- Defining mutations: Z27276, Z27283, Z29263
- Highest frequencies: Tibetans

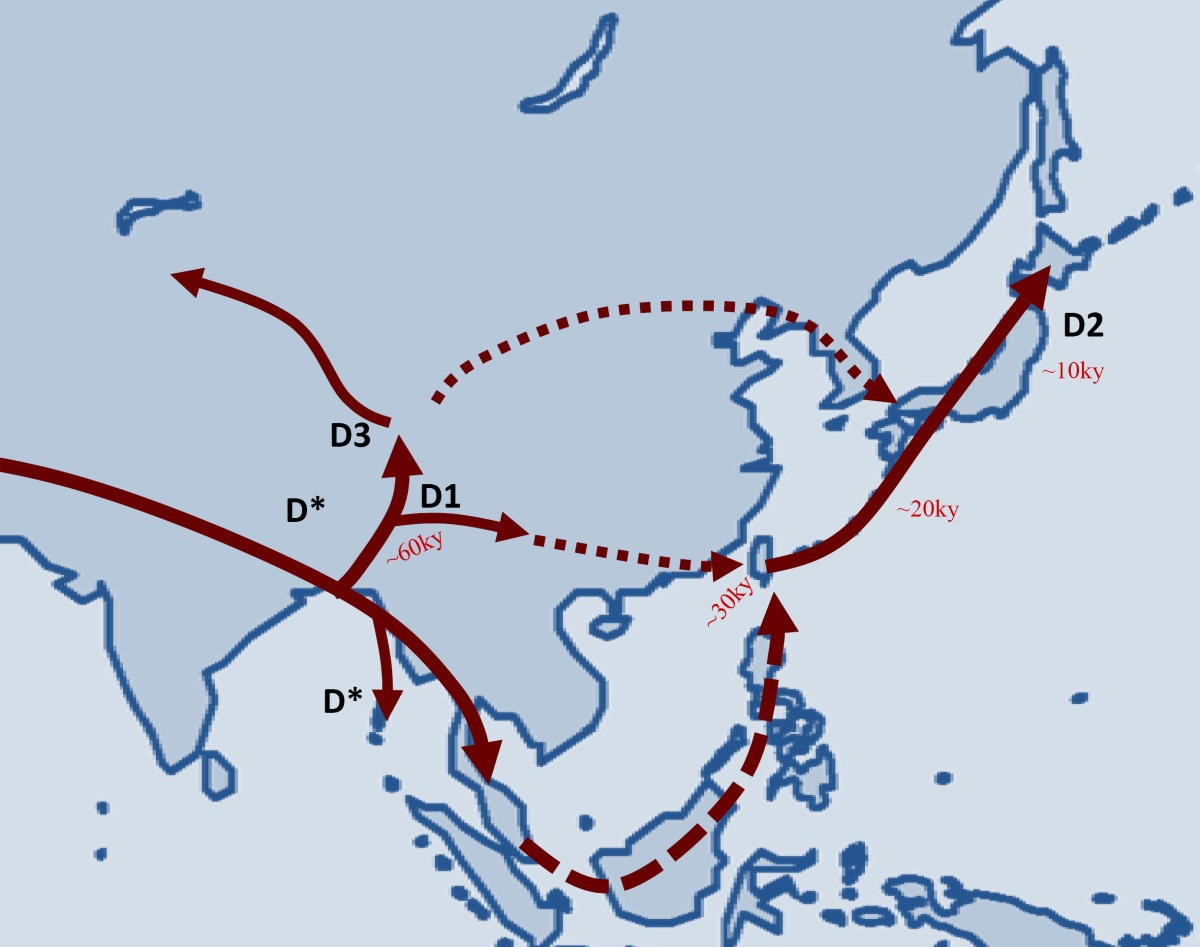
Likely migration route of haplogroup D in East Asia.

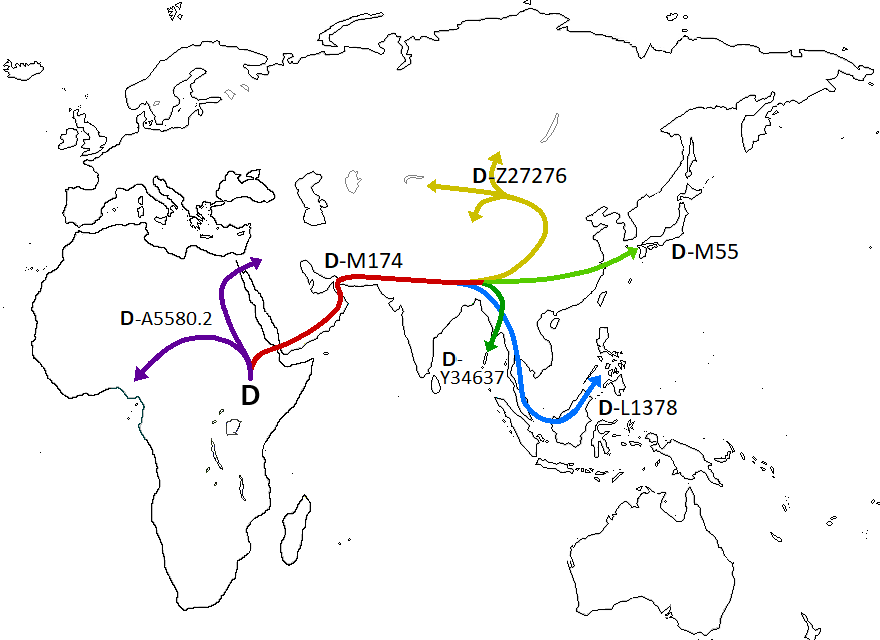
Migration route of haplogroup D, according to Haber et al. 2019.

Haplogroup D-Z27276 also known as Haplogroup D1a1 is a Y-chromosome haplogroup. It is one of two branches of Haplogroup D1, one of the descendants of Haplogroup D. The other is D-M55 which is only found in Japan.

This group is found in about 46.6% Tibetan people. It branched off D-M55 35,000-40,000 years before present or already 53,000 years before present.

One sample of a subgroup of D-Z27276 was also found among ancient samples of the Koban culture between Russia and Georgia.

== Phylogenetic tree ==
By ISOGG tree (Version: 14.151).

- DE (YAP)
  - D (CTS3946)
    - D1 (M174/Page30, IMS-JST021355, D-M174)
      - D1a (CTS11577)
        - D1a1 (F6251/Z27276)
          - D1a1a (M15) Tibet, Altai Republic, Mainland China
            - D1a1a (F849)
              - D1a1a1 (N1)
                - D1a1a1a (Z27269)
                  - D1a1a1a1 (PH4979)
                    - D1a1a1a1a2 (F729)
                      - D1a1a1a1a2a (F17412)
                        - D-F17412* Tibetan (Chamdo), Taiwan
                        - D-MF10280 Sichuan, Japan (Osaka)
                      - D1a1a1a1a2b (Y62194)
                        - D1a1a1a1a2b1 (F17409) Tibetan (Chamdo), Sichuan
                        - D1a1a1a1a2b2 (Y62517)
                          - D1a1a1a1a2b2a (F16077) Tibetan (Shigatse, Shannan, Lhasa)
                          - D1a1a1a1a2b2b (Y69263)
                            - D1a1a1a1a2b2b1 (Y161914) Tibetan (Chamdo), Zhejiang
                            - D1a1a1a1a2b2b2 (Y61759) Uzbekistan
                  - D1a1a1a2 (Z31591) Tibetan (Shigatse, Lhasa)
              - D1a1a2 (F1070) Guangdong, Xishuangbanna (Dai)
          - D1a1b (P99) Tibet, Mongol, Central Asia, Altai Republic, Mainland China
        - D1a2 (Z3660)
          - D1a2a (M64.1/Page44.1, M55) Japan (Yamato people, Ryukyuan people, Ainu people)
          - D1a2b (Y34637) Andaman Islands (Onge people, Jarawa people)
      - D1b (L1378) Philippines
    - D2 (A5580.2) Nigeria, Saudi Arabia, African Americans in the United States, Syria
