= Haplogroup D-M55 =

Human Y-chromosome DNA haplogroup

- Possible time of origin: 45,357 (95% CI 52,258–39,364) YBP; 45,200 (95% CI 48,500–42,000) YBP
- Coalescence age: 21,434 (95% CI 24,812–18,513) YBP; 21,000 (95% CI 22,800–19,300) YBP
- Possible place of origin: Japanese archipelago
- Ancestor: D-M174
- Defining mutations: M55, M57, M64.1, M179, P37.1, P41.1, P190, 12f2b
- Highest frequencies: Japanese people, Jōmon people, Ainu people, Ryukyuan people

Haplogroup D-M55 (M64.1/Page44.1) also known as Haplogroup D1a2a is a Y-chromosome haplogroup. It is one of two branches of Haplogroup D1a. The other is D1a1, which is found with high frequency in Tibetans and other Tibeto-Burmese populations and geographical close groups. D is also distributed with low to medium frequency in Central Asia, East Asia, and Mainland Southeast Asia.

Haplogroup D-M55 is found in about 33% of present-day Japanese males. It has been found in fourteen of a sample of sixteen or 87.5% of a sample of Ainu males in one study published in 2004 and in three of a sample of four or 75% of a sample of Ainu males in another study published in 2005 in which some individuals from the 2004 study may have been retested. It is currently the most common Y-DNA haplogroup in Japan if O1-F265 and O2-M122 (TMRCA 30,000–35,000 YBP) are considered as separate haplogroups.

In 2017, it was confirmed that the Japanese branch of haplogroup D-M55 is distinct and isolated from other branches of haplogroup D since about 50,000 years ago. The split in D1a may have occurred near the Tibetan Plateau.

== History ==
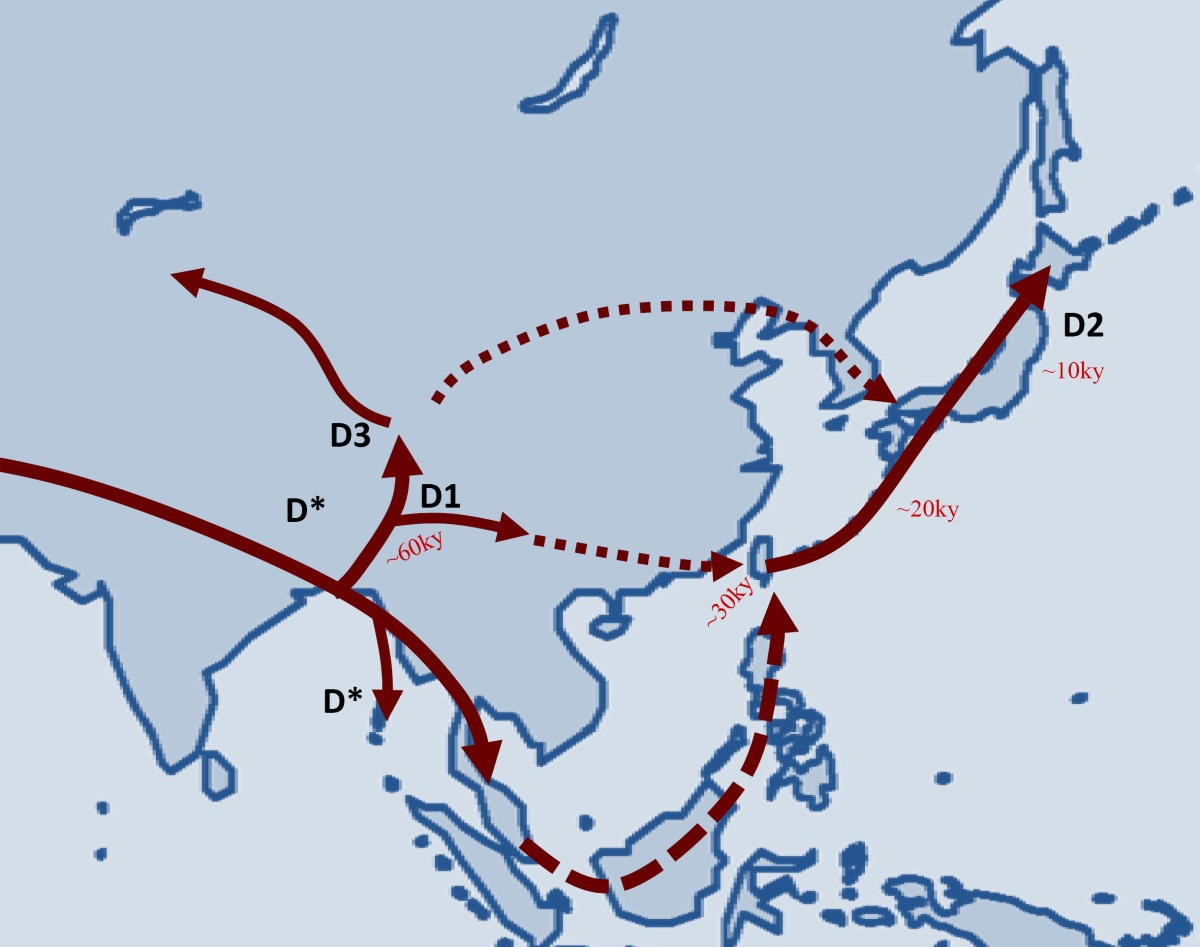
Likely migration route of haplogroup D in East Asia.

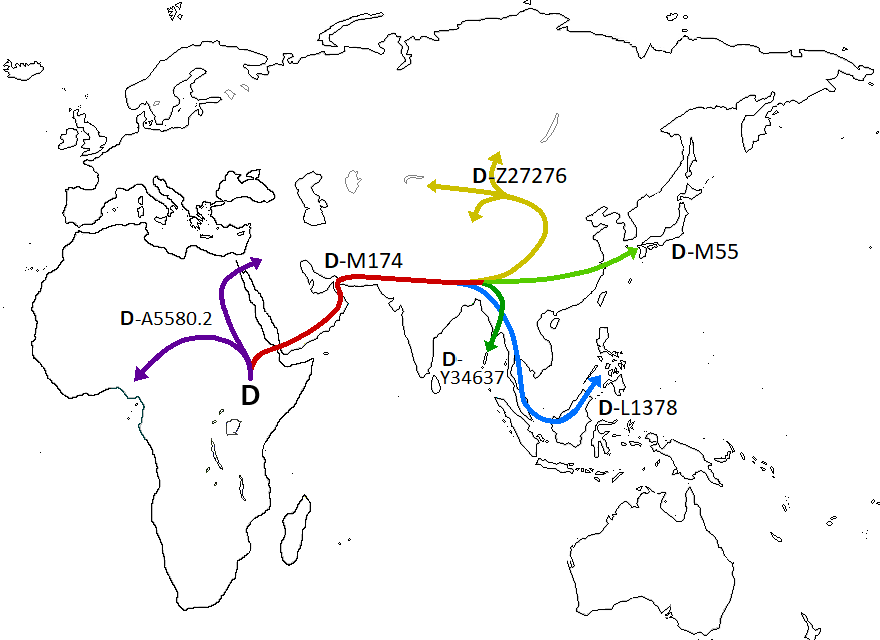
Possible migration route of haplogroup D.

Among the subgroups of Haplogroup D, the ancestor of D-M55 went eastward to reach the Japanese archipelago. According to Michael F. Hammer of the University of Arizona, haplogroup D originated near the Tibetan Plateau and migrated into Japan where it eventually became D-M55. Mitsuru Sakitani said that Haplogroup D1 came from Tibet to northern Kyushu via the Altai Mountains and the Korean Peninsula more than 50,000 years ago, and Haplogroup D-M55 (D1a2a) was born in the Japanese archipelago.

Recent studies suggest that D-M55 became dominant during the late Jōmon period, shortly before the arrival of the Yayoi, suggesting a population boom and bust.

== Frequency ==
The average frequency in Japanese is about 30%. High frequencies are found in various places in Japan, especially in Hokkaidō, eastern Honshū, southern Kyūshū, and Okinawa.

- Ainu people: 87.5% (Tajima et al. 2004)
- Asahikawa (Hokkaido): 63.7% (estimated from Y-STR haplotypes)
- Chiba: 45.5%
- Tokyo: 40.4% (21/57 = 36.8% JPT, 23/52 = 44.2%)
- Okinawa: 37.6% (0/7 Hateruma, 1/20 = 5.0% Iriomote, 8/29 = 27.6% Katsuren, 10/32 = 31.3% Yomitan, 16/49 = 32.7% Ishigaki, 13/38 = 34.2% Miyako, 13/36 = 36.1% Haebaru, 7/19 = 36.8% Gushikami, 35/87 = 40.2% Okinawa estimated from Y-STR haplotypes, 38/80 = 47.5% Itoman, 25/45 = 55.6% Okinawa)
- Kanto region: 37.6%
- Kyushu: 35.0% (8/31 = 25.8% Fukuoka Prefecture, 29/104 = 27.9% Kyushu, 90/300 = 30.0% Nagasaki college students, 39/129 = 30.2% Saga Prefectural Chienkan Senior High School students, 34/102 = 33.3% Fukuoka adult men, 7/21 = 33.3% Nagasaki Prefecture, 13/37 = 35.1% Ōita Prefecture, 95/270 = 35.2% Miyazaki Prefecture, 470/1285 = 36.6% Miyazaki Prefecture, 58/151 = 38.4% Kagoshima Prefecture, 5/11 = 45.5% Saga Prefecture, 22/47 = 46.8% Kumamoto Prefecture)
- Nagoya: 34.3% (estimated from Y-STR haplotypes)
- Sapporo: 33.9% (100/302 = 33.1% Sapporo college students, 72/206 = 35.0% Sapporo adult men)
- Kawasaki: 33.0%
- Shizuoka: 32.8%
- Kanazawa: 32.6% (97/298 = 32.6%, 76/232 = 32.8%)
- Aomori: 31.1% (22/79 = 27.8%, 11/27 = 40.7%)
- Shikoku: 30% (18/70 = 25.7% Tokushima, 9/31 = 29.0% Shikoku, 119/388 = 30.7% Tokushima college students)
- Micronesia: 1/17 = 5.9% (Hammer et al. 2006)
- South Korea: 3/75 = 4.0% (Hammer et al. 2006), 12/317 = 3.8% (estimated from Y-STR haplotypes), 8/506 = 1.6% (Kim et al. 2011)
- West Timor: 1/497 = 0.2% (Tumonggor et al. 2014)

== Ancient DNA ==
A Jōmon period man excavated from Funadomari remains (about 3,800–3,500 years ago) in Rebun Island in Hokkaido belongs to haplogroup D1a2a2a (D-CTS220).

The analysis of a Jōmon sample (Ikawazu) and an ancient sample from the Tibetan Plateau (Chokhopani) found only partially shared ancestry, suggesting a positive genetic bottleneck regarding the spread of haplogroup D from an ancient population related to the Tibetan Chokhopani sample (and modern Tibeto-Burmese groups).

== Phylogenetic tree ==
By ISOGG tree (Version: 14.151).

- DE (YAP)
  - D (CTS3946)
    - D1 (M174/Page30, IMS-JST021355, D-M174)
      - D1a (CTS11577)
        - D1a1 (F6251/Z27276)
          - D1a1a (M15) Tibet
          - D1a1b (P99) Tibet, Mongol, Central Asia
        - D1a2 (Z3660)
          - D1a2a (M64.1/Page44.1, M55) Japan (Yamato people, Ryukyuan people, Ainu people)
          - D1a2b (Y34637) Andaman Islands (Onge people, Jarawa people)
      - D1b (L1378) Philippines
    - D2 (A5580.2) Nigeria, African American, Saudi Arabia, Syria
