= Beshpeltir =

Beshpeltir Бешпельтир
- Village
- Location within Altai Republic Location within Russia
- Coordinates: 51°37′N 85°59′E
- Country: Russia
- Region: Altai Republic
- District: Chemalsky District
- Time zone: UTC+7:00

Beshpeltir (Russian: Бешпельтир; Altay: Бешпелтир, Beşpeltir) is a rural locality (a selo) and the administrative centre of Beshpeltirskoye Rural Settlement of Chemalsky District, the Altai Republic, Russia. The population was 480 as of 2016. There are 5 streets.

== Geography ==
Beshpeltir is located in the valley of the Katun River, south from Gorno-Altaysk at the confluence of the Kolbazhak and Elyunga rivers, 29 km north of Chemal (the district's administrative centre) by road. Uznezya is the nearest rural locality.
