= Haplogroup F-M89 =

Human Y chromosome DNA grouping indicating common ancestry

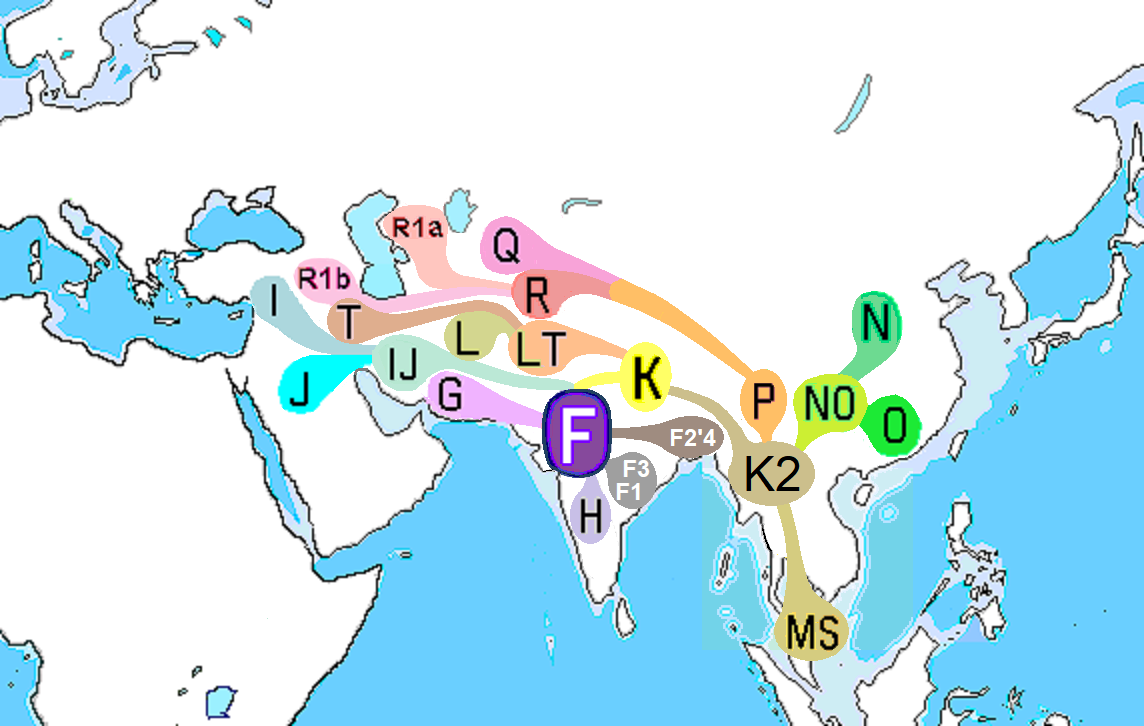
- Possible model of diversification of F-M89.
- Possible time of origin: 65,900 years BP; 57,500–62,500 years BP (Raghavan 2014); 45,000–55,700 years BP (Karafet 2008)
- Possible place of origin: West Asia, South Asia, or Southeast Asia
- Ancestor: CF
- Descendants: Primary: F1, F2, F3, GHIJK.
- Defining mutations: M89/PF2746, L132.1, M213/P137/Page38, M235/Page80, P14, P133, P134, P135, P136, P138, P139, P140, P141, P142, P145, P146, P148, P149, P151, P157, P158, P159, P160, P161, P163, P166, P187, P316

Haplogroup F, also known as F-M89 and FT, is a very common Y-chromosome haplogroup. The clade and its subclades constitute over 95% of paternal lineages outside of Africa.

The vast majority of individual males with F-M89 fall into its direct descendant Haplogroup GHIJK (F1329/M3658/PF2622/YSC0001299). In addition to GHIJK, haplogroup F has three other immediate descendant subclades: F1 (P91/P104), F2 (M427/M428), and F3 (M481). These three, with F* (M89*), constitute the paragroup F(xGHIJK). They are primarily found throughout South Asia, Southeast Asia and parts of East Asia.

Haplogroup GHIJK branches subsequently split into two direct descendants: G (M201/PF2957) and HIJK (F929/M578/PF3494/S6397). HIJK in turn splits into H (L901/M2939) and IJK (F-L15). The descendants of the haplogroup IJK include the clades I, J, K, and, ultimately, several major haplogroups descended from haplogroup K, namely: haplogroups M, N, O, P, Q, R, S, L, and T.

== Origins ==
It is estimated that the SNP M89 appeared 38,700–55,700 years ago, and most likely originated in West Asia, or Southeast Asia. It has also been suggested by previous research that F-M89 most likely first appeared in the Arabian Peninsula, Levant or North Africa, about 43,800–56,800 years ago. It has also been speculated that the possible location of this lineage's first expansion and rise to prevalence appears to have been in the Indian subcontinent, or somewhere close to it, and most of the descendant subclades and haplogroups appear to have radiated outward from the Persian Gulf and/or neighbouring parts of the Middle East or Southeast Asia.

Some lineages derived from haplogroup F-M89 appear to have back-migrated into Africa from West Asia, during prehistory. For example, subclades of F-M89 were discovered in ancient DNA samples from Sudan, which were associated with both Meroitic and Post-Meroitic burials.

== Distribution ==
The vast majority of living individuals carrying F-M89 belong to subclades of GHIJK. By comparison, cases of the paragroup F(xG,H,I,J,K) – that is, either basal F* (M89) or the primary subclades F1 (P91; P104), F2 (M427; M428) and F3 (M481) – are relatively rare worldwide.

=== F(xG,H,I,J,K) ===
A lack of precise, high resolution testing in the past makes it difficult to discuss F*, F1, F2* and F3* separately. ISOGG states that F(xG,H,I,J,K) has not been well studied, occurs "infrequently" in modern populations and peaks in South Asia, especially Sri Lanka. It also appears to have long been present in South East Asia. However, the possibility of misidentification is considered to be relatively high and some cases may in fact belong to misidentified subclades of haplogroup GHIJK. This was, for instance, the case with the subclade haplogroup H2 (P96), which was originally named "F3", i.e. – a name that has since been reassigned to F-M481.

F(xF1,F2,F3) has been reported among 10% of males in Sri Lanka, 5.2% of males across India (including up to 10% of males in South India), 5% in Pakistan, as well as lower levels among the Tamang people (Nepal), and in Iran.

Men originating in Indonesia have also been reported to carry F(xG,H,I,J,K) – especially F-M89* – at relatively significant levels. It has been reported at rates of 4-5% in Sulawesi and Lembata. One study, which did not comprehensively screen for other subclades of F-M89 (including some subclades of GHIJK), found that Indonesian men with the SNP P14/PF2704 (which is equivalent to M89), comprise 1.8% of men in West Timor, 1.5% of Flores 5.4% of Lembata 2.3% of Sulawesi and 0.2% in Sumatra. F1 (P91), F2 (M427) and F3 (M481; previously F5) are all highly rare and virtually exclusive to regions/ethnic minorities in Sri Lanka, India, Nepal, South China, Thailand, Burma, and Vietnam.

In Central Asia, examples of F(xG,H,I,J,K) have been reported in individuals from Turkmenistan and Uzbekistan.

Kutanan et al. (2020) have found F*-M89 in 50.0% (8/16) of a sample of Red Lahu, 47.1% (8/17) of a sample of Black Lahu, and 6.7% (1/15) of a sample of Lisu in Mae Hong Son Province of Thailand. All these Loloish-speaking members of F*-M89 in northwestern Thailand have been found to be quite closely related in the paternal line, with the TMRCA of their Y-DNA estimated to be 584 years before present. However, the aforementioned Y-chromosomes are only distantly related to instances of F*-M89 observed in samples of other populations of Thailand, including 5.6% (1/18) of a sample of Phuan from Central Thailand, 11.8% (2/17) of a sample of Soa from Northeast Thailand, and 29% (2/7) of a sample of Saek from Northeast Thailand. The TMRCA of the Loloish cluster from North Thailand and the Y-DNA of the Phuan individual from Central Thailand has been estimated to be 12,675 years before present. The TMRCA of the F*-M89 cluster from Northeast Thailand has been estimated to be 6,492 years before present. The TMRCA of all these F*-M89 individuals from Thailand has been estimated to be 16,006 years before present.

There is also evidence of westward Paleolithic back-migration of F(xG,H,I,J,K) from South Asia, to Iran, Arabia and North East Africa, as well as subclades of haplogroup K to South-East Europe.

Neolithic migration into Europe from Southwest Asia, by first wave of farmers in Europe has been put forward as the source of F and G2a found in European Neolithic remains, dating from circa 4000 BCE. These remains, according to Herrerra et al. (2012) showed a "greater genetic similarity" to "individuals from the modern Near East" than to modern Europeans. F(xG,H,I,J,K) may have been found in Bronze Age remains from Europe, namely the individuals known as DEB 20 and DEB 38, who lived about 7,000–7,210 BP, and were found at the Derenburg Meerenstieg II site in Germany.

Three less certain cases, which have not been tested for all subclades of GHIJK, have been found among Neolithic remains in Europe. I0411 (Troc 4), who lived 7,195–7,080 years BP, was found in the Els Trocs cave, near Bisaurri (modern Spain) – while haplogroups G, I1 (I-M450; I-S247) J, L1b2, Q1b1, Q1a2a, R1a1a1 (R-L449), R1b1a2b1a (R-M35) and T were ruled out, I2a1b1 and R1b1a2 were found in other remains from the same site (Troc 5 and Troc 2). Similarly, three sets of remains from Hungary were not tested for all subclades of GHIJK: BAM 17, BAM 26 (both from Alsónyék Bátaszék, circa 7,850–7,675 years BP) and TOLM 3 (7,030–7,230 BP, found in Tolna-Mözs). (An individual known to scholars as "Oase 1", who lived circa 37,800 years BP in Eastern Europe, was initially classified as belonging either to paragroup F(xGHIJK) or within K. However, subsequent research has revealed that Oase 1 belonged to K2a*.)

- found higher in Philippines, and Indonesia

Some cases reported amongst modern populations of Europeans, Native Americans and Pacific Islanders may be due to migration and admixture of F(xG,H,I,J,K), as a result of contact with South and/or South East Asia, during the early modern era (16th–19th Century). Such examples include:

- low levels in Polynesia;
- higher among Seminole and Boruca Native Americans;
- rare cases in the Netherlands;
- two cases in Portugal.

==== F* (M89*) ====
Basal F-M89* has been reported among 5.2% of males in India. A regional breakdown was provided by Chiaroni et al. (2009): 10% in South India; 8% in Central India; about 1.0% in North India and Western India, as well as 5% in Pakistan; 10% in Sri Lanka; 4% among the Tamang people of Nepal; 2% in Borneo and Java; 4-5% in Sulawesi and Lembata in Southeast Asia.

In Iran, 2.3% of Bandari males from Hormozgan Province have been found to carry basal F-M89.

Haplogroup FM89* is found in Han Chinese at up to 11.67%

Haplogroup F-M89 has also been observed in Northeast Africa among two Christian period individuals, who were excavated on the Nile's Fourth Cataract and on Meroe Island. The remains of the Bacho-Kiro cave prehistoric individual F6-620 / AA7-738, from Initial Upper Paleolithic, dated to between 45,930 and 42,580 calibrated years before present, carry also the basal lineage of the Y chromosome haplogroup F-M89.

==== F1 (P91) ====
Haplogroup F1 is defined by the SNP P91. It is most common in Sri Lanka.

==== F2 (M427) ====
Haplogroup F2 Y-chromosomes have been reported among minorities from the borderlands of South China (Yunnan and Guizhou), Thailand, Burma, and Vietnam, namely the Yi and Kucong or Lahu Shi ("Yellow Lahu"), a subgroup of the Lahu.

==== F3 (M481) ====
The newly-defined and rare subclade haplogroup F3 (M481; previously F5) has been found in India and Nepal, among the Tharu people and in Andhra Pradesh. F-M481 should not be confused with haplogroup H2 (L279, L281, L284, L285, L286, M282, P96), which was previously misclassified under F-M89, as "F3".

=== Haplogroup GHIJK ===
Basal GHIJK has never been found, either in living males or ancient remains.

Subclades – including some major haplogroups – are widespread in modern populations of the Central Asia, South Asia, Middle East, Caucasus, Europe, South East Asia, Pacific Islands and Native Americans.

== Phylogenetics ==
In Y-chromosome phylogenetics, subclades are the branches of haplogroups. These subclades are also defined by single nucleotide polymorphisms (SNPs) or unique event polymorphisms (UEPs).

=== Phylogenetic trees ===
There are several confirmed and proposed phylogenetic trees available for haplogroup F-M89. The scientifically accepted one is the Y-Chromosome Consortium (YCC) one published in Karafet 2008 and subsequently updated. A draft tree that shows emerging science is provided by Thomas Krahn at the Genomic Research Center in Houston, Texas. The International Society of Genetic Genealogy (ISOGG) also provides an amateur tree.

=== The Genomic Research Center draft tree ===
The Genomic Research Center's draft tree for haplogroup F-M89 is as follows. (Only the first three levels of subclades are shown.)

- F-M89 P14, M89, M213, P133, P134, P135, P136, P138, P139, P140, P141, P142, P145, P146, P148, P149, P151, P157, P158, P159, P160, P161, P163, P166, P187, P316, L132.1, L313, L498
  - F-P91 P91, P104
  - F-M427 M427, M428
  - F-P96 P96, M282, L279, L281, L284, L285, L286
    - F-L280 L280
  - G-M201 M201, P257, L116, L154, L204, L240, L269, L402, L605, L769, L770, L836, L837, L1258, U2, U3, U6, U7, U12, U17, U20, U21, U23, U33
  - H-M69 M69, M370, PAGES00049
  - IJK L15, L16

=== YCC/ISOGG tree ===
This is the official scientific tree produced by the Y-Chromosome Consortium (YCC). The last major update was in 2008. Subsequent updates have been quarterly and biannual. The current version is a revision of the 2010 update.

- CF
  - F (L132.1, M89/PF2746).
    - F1 (P91, P104)
    - F2 (M427, M428)
    - F3 (M481)
    - Macrohaplogroup GHIJK (F1329/M3658/PF2622/YSC0001299).

=== Phylogenetic history ===
Prior to 2002, there were in academic literature at least seven naming systems for the Y-Chromosome Phylogenetic tree. This led to considerable confusion. In 2002, the major research groups came together and formed the Y-Chromosome Consortium (YCC). They published a joint paper that created a single new tree that all agreed to use. Later, a group of citizen scientists with an interest in population genetics and genetic genealogy formed a working group to create an amateur tree aiming at being above all timely. The table below brings together all of these works at the point of the landmark 2002 YCC Tree. This allows a researcher reviewing older published literature to quickly move between nomenclatures.

| YCC 2002/2008 (Shorthand) | (α) | (β) | (γ) | (δ) | (ε) | (ζ) | (η) | YCC 2002 (Longhand) | YCC 2005 (Longhand) | YCC 2008 (Longhand) | YCC 2010r (Longhand) | ISOGG 2006 | ISOGG 2007 | ISOGG 2008 | ISOGG 2009 | ISOGG 2010 | ISOGG 2011 | ISOGG 2012 |
| F-M89 | 2 | VI | 1R | 20 | Eu10 | H4 | B | F* | F | F | F | F | F | F | F | F | F | F |
| F-APT/H-APT | 15 | VI | 1R | 20 | Eu10 | H4 | B | F1 | H2 | H2 | H2 | H2 | H2 | H2 | H2 | H2 | H2 | H2 |

== See also ==
=== Genetics ===
- Genetics and archaeogenetics of South Asia
- Genetic history of the Middle East
- Conversion table for Y chromosome haplogroups
- Genetic Genealogy
- Haplogroup
- Haplotype
- Human Y-chromosome DNA haplogroup
- Molecular phylogenetics
- Paragroup
- Subclade
- Y-chromosomal Aaron
- Y-chromosome haplogroups in populations of the world
- Y-DNA haplogroups by ethnic group
- Y-DNA haplogroups in populations of South Asia
