= Kulada =

Kulada Кулада
- Village
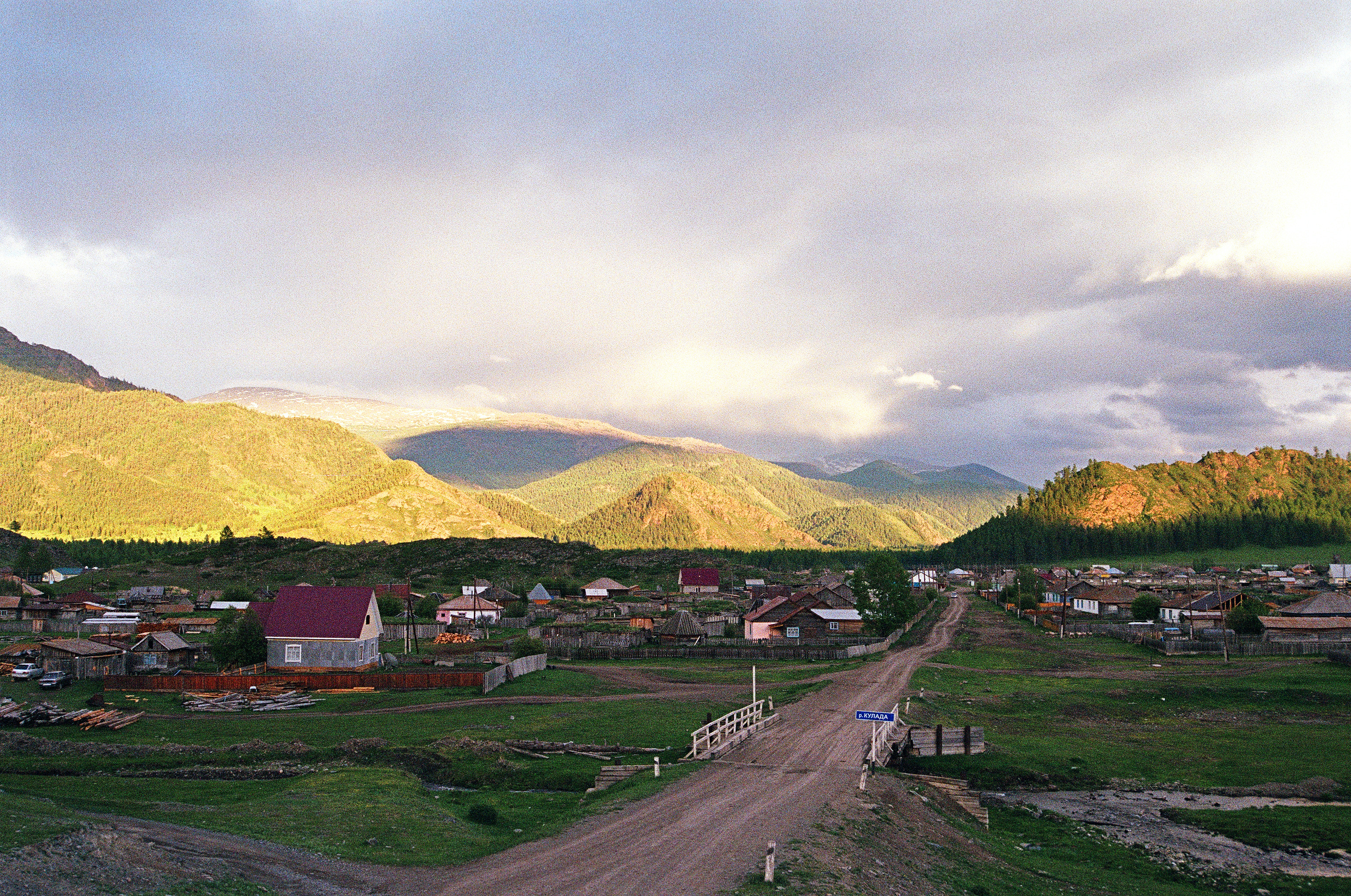

- Location within Altai Republic Location within Russia
- Coordinates: 50°41′N 85°47′E
- Country: Russia
- Region: Altai Republic
- District: Ongudaysky District
- Time zone: UTC+7:00

Kulada (Russian: Кулада; Altay: Кулады, Kuladı) is a rural locality (a selo) and the administrative centre of Kuladinskoye Rural Settlement of Ongudaysky District, the Altai Republic, Russia. The population was 467 as of 2016. There are 11 streets.

== Geography ==
Kulada is located 37 km southwest of Onguday (the district's administrative centre) by road. Boochi is the nearest rural locality.
