= Unique-event polymorphism =

In genetic genealogy, a unique-event polymorphism (UEP) is a genetic marker that corresponds to a mutation that is likely to occur so infrequently that it is believed overwhelmingly probable that all the individuals who share the marker, worldwide, will have inherited it from the same common ancestor, and the same single mutation event.

Generally, UEP is an allele for which all copies derive from a single mutational event.

In genetic genealogy, the mutations considered to be UEPs can be any germline mutation. They are usually single-nucleotide polymorphisms (SNP) – the replacement of one letter by another in the DNA sequence, and the terms UEP and SNP are often loosely used interchangeably. But UEPs may also be large-scale additions, such as the YAP insertion that defines Y-DNA haplogroup DE, inversions or deletions.

The discovery and widespread testing of new UEPs has been the key to the increasingly detailed analysis of the patrilineal and matrilineal ancestry of mankind into more distinct family trees of Y-DNA and mtDNA haplogroups. UEPs in X and autosomal chromosomes are also used to trace genealogy, to extend the time ranges available for Y-DNA and mtDNA.

== Comparison with short tandem repeats (STRs) ==
The properties of UEPs can be contrasted with those of short tandem repeat sequences (STRs), the other main type of genetic variation used in genealogical DNA testing.

Unlike UEPs, STR sequences are highly variable. There is a significant probability that one of a set may have changed its repeat number after only a few generations. That makes a particular STR haplotype much more specific, matching a much smaller number of people. But, it also means that, at least in the case of Y-STR markers, quite unrelated lineages may have converged to the same combination of Y-STR markers entirely independently by different routes. Matching Y-STR markers by themselves cannot be used to indicate genetic relatedness.

The exception is those few cases where Y-STR markers can take on the status of UEPs. This is the case of the occurrence of a large-scale deletion event, which caused a sudden big change in the Y-STR repeat number, rather than the usual single increment or decrement. Such an occurrence can be considered to have been a unique one-off in a group of lineages. Such a change in the Y-STR DYS413, for example, distinguishes subgroup J2a1 from J2a in Y-DNA haplogroup J.

== See also ==
- Haplogroup
- Single-nucleotide polymorphism
