= Paragroup =

Concept in population genetics

Paragroup is a term used in population genetics to describe lineages within a haplogroup that are not defined by any additional unique markers.

In human Y-chromosome DNA haplogroups, paragroups are typically represented by an asterisk (*) placed after the main haplogroup.

The term "paragroup" is a portmanteau of the terms paraphyletic haplogroup indicating that paragroups form paraphyletic subclades. Apart from the mutations that define the parent haplogroup, paragroups may not possess any additional unique markers. Alternatively paragroups may possess unique markers that have not been discovered. If a unique marker is discovered within a paragroup, the specific lineage is given a unique name and is moved out of the paragroup to form an independent subclade.

For example, the paragroup of human Y-DNA Haplogroup DE is DE*. A member of DE* has the marker that defines DE, but not the markers that define DE's only known immediate subclades, haplogroups D and E. Likewise, haplogroup E1b1b1g (also known as E-M293) is an example of a relatively new subclade, discovered within a previously designated paragroup and assigned a new name. Until the SNP/UEP marker M293 was discovered in 2008, the members of the subclade were indistinguishable from other components of the paragroup E1b1b1* (also known as E3b* and E-M35*).

Another example is a member of the Y-DNA haplogroup R (defined by marker M207) may belong to the sub-haplogroup R1 (defined by marker M173) or R2 (defined by marker M124). Individuals with neither of these mutations would be categorised as belonging to haplogroup R*.
