= Haplogroup A-L1085 =

Human Y-chromosome DNA haplogroup

- Possible time of origin: 140,000 YBP, 125,000 - 382,000 YBP
- Possible place of origin: Central-Northwest Africa
- Ancestor: Homo Y-MRCA
- Descendants: A-V148 (A0), A-P305 (A1)
- Highest frequencies: Namibia (Tsumkwe San, Nama) 60-70% Southern Sudan (Dinka, Shilluk, Nuer) 33%-61.5% Ethiopia (Beta Israel ) 41%-46%

Haplogroup A-L1085, also known as haplogroup A0-T, is a human Y-DNA haplogroup. It is part of the paternal lineage of almost all humans alive today. The SNP L1085 has played two roles in population genetics: firstly, most Y-DNA haplogroups have diverged from it and; secondly, it defines the undiverged basal clade A-L1085*.

A0-T has two primary branches: A-V148 (also known as haplogroup A0) and haplogroup A-P305 (haplogroup A1).

== Origin ==
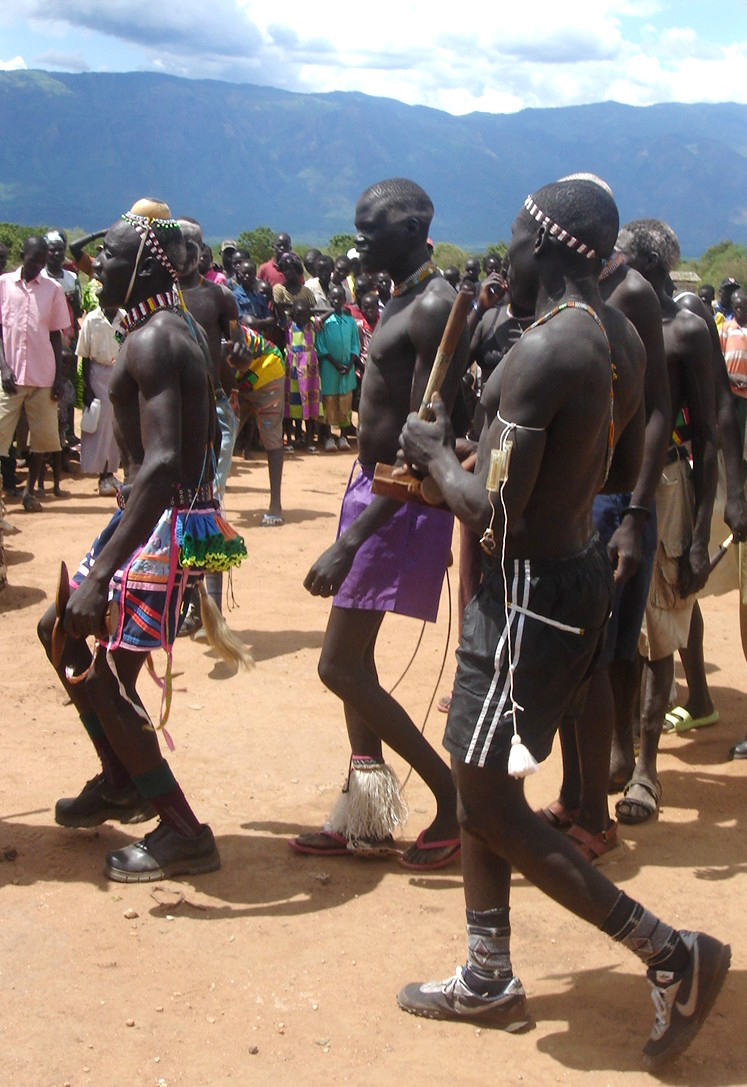
Haplogroup A is common among Nilotic peoples. The Khoisan people are known to carry a subclade of haplogroup A at very high frequency.

Many proposals for haplogroup A-L1085's origin suggest it was associated with the ancestral population of Southern Africa's hunter-gatherers. This is because haplogroup A-L1085 lineages are frequent among the San people.

However, the A-L1085 lineages of Southern Africa are subclades of A lineages found in other parts of Africa, mostly among Nilotic peoples but also among other Africans. This suggests that A-L1085 lineages arrived in Southern Africa from elsewhere. The two most basal lineages of Haplogroup A-L1085, A-V148 and A-P305, have been detected in West Africa, Northwest Africa and Central Africa. Cruciani et al. 2011 suggests that these lineages may have emerged somewhere in between Central and Northwest Africa, though such an interpretation is still preliminary due to the incomplete geographic coverage of African y-chromosomes.

Initial studies reported that Haplogroup A-L1085 lineages emerged around 60,000 years ago which was significantly more recent than TMRCA for mitochondrial DNA lineages which coalesce to between 150-200kya. Cruciani et al. 2011 with major restructuring of branches pushed back the root of the Y-chromosome tree to 142,000 years ago.

In November 2012, a new study by Scozzari et al. reinforced "the hypothesis of an origin in the north-western quadrant of the African continent for the A1b haplogroup, and, together with recent findings of ancient Y-Chromosome lineages in central-western Africa, provide new evidence regarding the geographical origin of human MSY diversity".

== Geographical distribution ==
=== Central Africa ===
Haplogroup A-M13 has been observed in populations of northern Cameroon (2/9 = 22% Tupuri, 4/28 = 14% Mandara, 2/17 = 12% Fulbe) and eastern DRC (2/9 = 22% Alur, 1/18 = 6% Hema, 1/47 = 2% Mbuti).

Haplogroup A-M91(xA-M31,A-M6,A-M32) has been observed in the Bakola people of southern Cameroon (3/33 = 9%).

Without testing for any subclade, haplogroup A-L1085 has been observed in samples of several populations of Gabon, including 9% (3/33) of a sample of Baka, 3% (1/36) of a sample of Ndumu, 2% (1/46) of a sample of Duma, 2% (1/57) of a sample of Nzebi, and 2% (1/60) of a sample of Tsogo.

=== East Africa ===
Haplogroup A-M13 is common among the Southern Sudanese (53%), especially the Dinka (61.5%). Haplogroup A-M13 also has been observed in another sample of a South Sudanese population at a frequency of 45% (18/40), including 1/40 A-M171. Haplogroup A also has been reported in 14.6% (7/48) of an Amhara sample, 10.3% (8/78) of an Oromo sample, 13.6% (12/88) of another sample from Ethiopia, and 41% of a sample of the Beta Israel (Cruciani et al. 2002), and important percentages are also shared by Bantus in Kenya (14%, Luis et al. 2004) and Iraqw in Tanzania (3/43 = 7.0% (Luis et al. 2004) to 1/6 = 17% (Knight et al. 2003)).

=== North Africa ===
The subclade A1 has been observed in Libyan Berbers, while the subclade A-M13 has been observed in approximately 3% of Egyptian males.

=== Southern Africa ===
One study has found haplogroup A in samples of various Khoisan-speaking groups with frequency ranging from 10% to 70%. This particular haplogroup was not found in a sample of the Hadzabe from Tanzania, a population occasionally grouped with other Khoisan groups due to the presence of click consonants in their language, but whose language was thoroughly demonstrated to be an isolate as unrelated to them as other languages by work by linguist Bonny Sands.

=== Europe ===
Haplogroup A has been observed as A1 in European men in England. A Y chromosome has been observed also with low frequency in Asia Minor, in the Middle East and in some Mediterranean islands, among Aegean Greeks, Sicilians (0.2% of A1a in Capo d'Orlando and 0.5% of A1b in all the island), Palestinians, Jordanians and Yemenites. Without testing for any subclade, haplogroup A1b has been observed in a sample of Greeks from Mitilini on the Aegean island of Lesvos and A1b has been observed also on 0.1% of Iberian Jewish. The authors of one study have reported finding what appears to be haplogroup A in 3.1% (2/65) of a sample of Cypriots, though they have not definitively excluded the possibility that either of these individuals may belong to haplogroup B.

== Subclade distribution ==
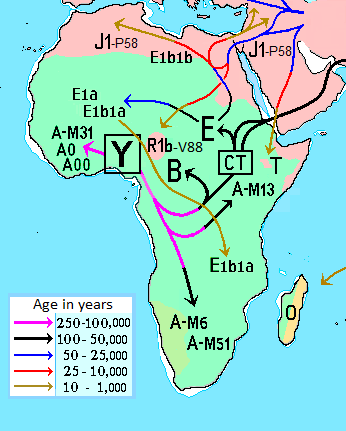
Diversion of haplogroup A (Y-DNA) and its descendants.

=== A-V148* (A0)*) ===
A-V148 is one of two primary branches in A0-T.

=== A-P305* (A1*) ===
Haplogroup A-P305* is largely restricted to parts of Africa, though a handful of cases have been reported in Europe and Western Asia.

A-P305 is found at its highest rates in Bakola Pygmies (South Cameroon) at 8.3% and Berbers from Algeria at 1.5% and in Ghana. The clade also achieves high frequencies in the Bushmen hunter-gatherer populations of Southern Africa, followed closely by many Nilotic groups in Eastern Africa. However, haplogroup A's oldest sub-clades are exclusively found in Central-Northwest Africa, where it, and consequently Y-chromosomal Adam, is believed to have originated about 140,000 years ago. The clade has also been observed at notable frequencies in certain populations in Ethiopia, as well as some Pygmy groups in Central Africa.

Haplogroup A-L1085 is less common among Niger–Congo speakers, who largely belong to the E1b1a clade. Haplogroup E in general is believed to have originated in Northeast Africa, and was later introduced to West Africa from where it spread around 5,000 years ago to Central, Southern and Southeastern Africa with the Bantu expansion. According to Wood et al. (2005) and Rosa et al. (2007), such relatively recent population movements from West Africa changed the pre-existing population Y chromosomal diversity in Central, Southern and Southeastern Africa, replacing the previous haplogroups in these areas with the now dominant E1b1a lineages. Traces of ancestral inhabitants, however, can be observed today in these regions via the presence of the Y DNA haplogroups A-M91 and B-M60 that are common in certain relict populations, such as the Mbuti Pygmies and the Khoisan.

Haplogroup A frequencies in Africa
Study population	Freq. (in %)	Ref.
Tsumkwe San (Namibia)	66	
Nama (Namibia)	64	
Dinka (Sudan)	62	
Shilluk (Sudan)	53	
Nuba (Sudan)	46	
Khoisan	44	
Ethiopian Jews	41	
!Kung/Sekele	~40	
Borgu (Sudan)	35	
Nuer (Sudan)	33	
Fur (Sudan)	31	
Maasai (Kenya)	27	
Nara (Eritrea)	20	
Masalit (Sudan)	19	
Amhara (Ethiopia)	~16	
Ethiopians	14	
Bantu (Kenya)	14	
Mandara (Cameroon)	14	
Hausa (Sudan)	13	
Khwe (South Africa)	12	
Fulbe (Cameroon)	12	
Dama (Namibia)	11	
Oromo (Ethiopia)	10	
Kunama (Eritrea)	10	
South Semitic (Ethiopia)	10	
Arabs (Egypt)	3	

In a composite sample of 3551 African men, Haplogroup A had a frequency of 5.4%. The highest frequencies of haplogroup A have been reported among the Khoisan of Southern Africa, Beta Israel, and Nilo-Saharans.

=== A-M31 ===
The subclade A-M31 has been found in approximately 2.8% (8/282) of a pool of seven samples of various ethnic groups in Guinea-Bissau, especially among the Papel-Manjaco-Mancanha (5/64 = 7.8%). An earlier study, Gonçalves et al. 2003, reported finding A-M31 in 5.1% (14/276) of a sample from Guinea-Bissau and in 0.5% (1/201) of a pair of samples from Cabo Verde. The authors of another study have reported finding haplogroup A-M31 in 5% (2/39) of a sample of Mandinka from Senegambia and 2% (1/55) of a sample of Dogon from Mali. Haplogroup A-M31 also has been found in 3% (2/64) of a sample of Berbers from Morocco and 2.3% (1/44) of a sample of unspecified ethnic affiliation from Mali.

At least seven men with ancestral origins in Yorkshire, England, and sharing the distinctive surname Revis, have been identified as belonging to subclade A-M31. News reports suggested that the men were phenotypically "European" and unaware of any African ancestry. Subsequent research suggested that they shared a common patrilineal ancestor in the 18th century.

=== A-M6 ===
A-M6 (formerly A2) is typically found among Khoisan peoples. The authors of one study have reported finding haplogroup A-M6(xA-P28) in 28% (8/29) of a sample of Tsumkwe San and 16% (5/32) of a sample of !Kung/Sekele, and haplogroup A-P28 in 17% (5/29) of a sample of Tsumkwe San, 9% (3/32) of a sample of !Kung/Sekele, 9% (1/11) of a sample of Nama, and 6% (1/18) of a sample of Dama. The authors of another study have reported finding haplogroup A-M6 in 15.4% (6/39) of a sample of Khoisan males, including 5/39 A-M6(xA-M114) and 1/39 A-M114.

=== A-M32 ===
The clade A-M32 (formerly A3) contains the most populous branches of haplogroup A-L1085 and is mainly found in Eastern Africa and Southern Africa.

==== A-M28 ====
The subclade A-M28 (formerly A3a) has only been rarely observed in the Horn of Africa. In 5% (1/20) of a mixed sample of speakers of South Semitic languages from Ethiopia, 1.1% (1/88) of a sample of Ethiopians, and 0.5% (1/201) in Somalis.

==== A-M51 ====
The subclade A-M51 (formerly A3b1) occurs most frequently among Khoisan peoples (6/11 = 55% Nama, 11/39 = 28% Khoisan, 7/32 = 22% !Kung/Sekele, 6/29 = 21% Tsumkwe San, 1/18 = 6% Dama). However, it also has been found with lower frequency among Bantu peoples of Southern Africa, including 2/28 = 7% Sotho–Tswana, 3/53 = 6% non-Khoisan Southern Africans, 4/80 = 5% Xhosa, and 1/29 = 3% Zulu.

==== A-M13 ====
The subclade A-M13 (formerly A3b2) that is commonly found in East Africa and northern Cameroon is different from those found in the Khoisan samples and only remotely related to them. This finding suggests an ancient divergence.

In Sudan, haplogroup A-M13 has been found in 28/53 = 52.8% of Southern Sudanese, 13/28 = 46.4% of the Nuba of central Sudan, 25/90 = 27.8% of Western Sudanese, 4/32 = 12.5% of local Hausa people, and 5/216 = 2.3% of Northern Sudanese.

In Ethiopia, one study has reported finding haplogroup A-M13 in 14.6% (7/48) of a sample of Amhara and 10.3% (8/78) of a sample of Oromo. Another study has reported finding haplogroup A-M118 in 6.8% (6/88) and haplogroup A-M13(xA-M171, A-M118) in 5.7% (5/88) of a mixed sample of Ethiopians, amounting to a total of 12.5% (11/88) A-M13.

Haplogroup A-M13 also has been observed occasionally outside of Central and Eastern Africa, as in the Aegean Region of Turkey (2/30 = 6.7%), Yemenite Jews (1/20 = 5%), Egypt (4/147 = 2.7%, 3/92 = 3.3%), Palestinian Arabs (2/143 = 1.4%), Sardinia (1/77 = 1.3%, 1/22 = 4.5%), the capital of Jordan, Amman (1/101=1%), and Oman (1/121 = 0.8%).

== Phylogenetics ==
=== Phylogenetic history ===
Prior to 2002, there were in academic literature at least seven naming systems for the Y-Chromosome Phylogenetic tree. This led to considerable confusion. In 2002, the major research groups came together and formed the Y-Chromosome Consortium (YCC). They published a joint paper that created a single new tree that all agreed to use. Later, a group of citizen scientists with an interest in population genetics and genetic genealogy formed a working group to create an amateur tree aiming at being above all timely. The table below brings together all of these works at the point of the landmark 2002 YCC Tree. This allows a researcher reviewing older published literature to quickly move between nomenclatures.

YCC 2002/2008 (Shorthand)	(α)	(β)	(γ)	(δ)	(ε)	(ζ)	(η)	YCC 2002 (Longhand)	YCC 2005 (Longhand)	YCC 2008 (Longhand)	YCC 2010r (Longhand)	ISOGG 2006	ISOGG 2007	ISOGG 2008	ISOGG 2009	ISOGG 2010	ISOGG 2011	ISOGG 2012
A-M31	7	I	1A	1	–	H1	A	A1	A1	A1	A1a	A1	A1	A1a	A1a	A1a	A1a	A1a
A-M6	27	I	2	3	–	H1	A	A2*	A2	A2	A2	A2	A2	A2	A2	A2	A2	A1b1a1a
A-M114	27	I	2	3	–	H1	A	A2a	A2a	A2a	A2a	A2a	A2a	A2a	A2a	A2a	A2a	A1b1a1a1a
A-P28	27	I	2	4	–	H1	A	A2b	A2b	A2b	A2b	A2b	A2b	A2b	A2b	A2b	A2b	A1b1a1a1b
A-M32	*	*	*	*	*	*	*	*	A3	A3	A3	A3	A3	A3	A3	A3	A3	A1b1b
A-M28	7	I	1A	1	–	H1	A	A3a	A3a	A3a	A3a	A3a	A3a	A3a	A3a	A3a	A3a	A1b1b1
A-M51	7	I	1A	1	–	H1	A	A3b1	A3b1	A3b1	A3b1	A3b1	A3b1	A3b1	A3b1	A3b1	A3b1	A1b1b2a
A-M13	7	I	1A	2	Eu1	H1	A	A3b2*	A3b2	A3b2	A3b2	A3b2	A3b2	A3b2	A3b2	A3b2	A3b2	A1b1b2b
A-M171	7	I	1A	2	Eu1	H1	A	A3b2a	A3b2a	A3b2a	A3b2a	A3b2a	A3b2a	A3b2a	A3b2a	A3b2a	A3b2a	removed
A-M118	7	I	1A	2	Eu1	H1	A	A3b2b	A3b2b	A3b2b	A3b2b	A3b2b	A3b2b	A3b2b	A3b2b	A3b2b	A3b2b	A1b1b2b1

==== Original research publications ====
The following research teams per their publications were represented in the creation of the YCC Tree.

- α Jobling and Tyler-Smith 2000 and Kaladjieva 2001
- β Underhill 2000
- γ Hammer 2001
- δ Karafet 2001
- ε Semino 2000
- ζ Su 1999
- η Capelli 2001

==== Cruciani 2011 ====
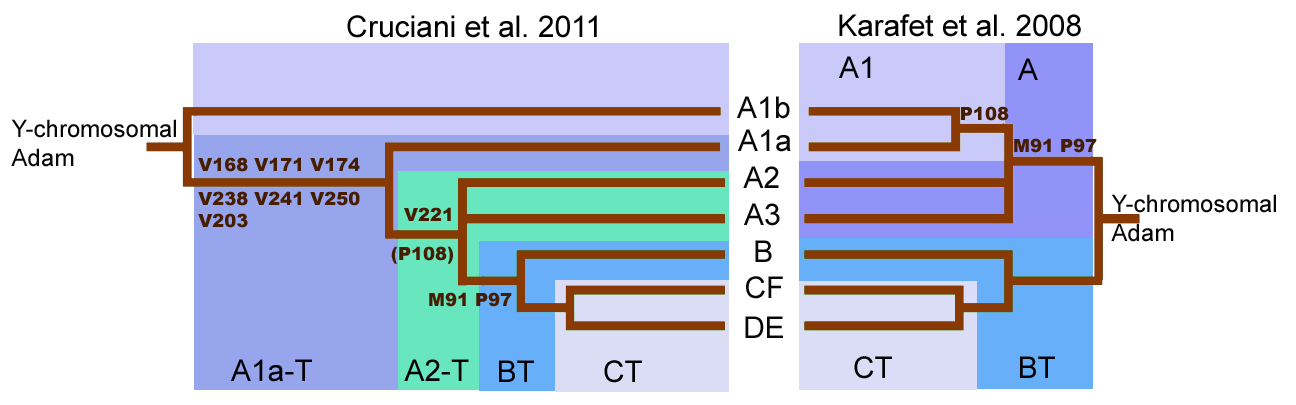
The revised y-chromosome family tree by Cruciani et al. 2011 compared with the family tree from Karafet et al. 2008. A1b is now known as A0 according to ISOGG.

A major shift in understanding of the Haplogroup A tree came with the publication of (Cruciani 2011). Initial sequencing of the human y-chromosome suggested that first split in the Y-Chromosome family tree occurred with the M91 mutation that separated Haplogroup A from Haplogroup BT. However, it is now known that deepest split in the Y-chromosome tree is found between two previously reported subclades of Haplogroup A, rather than between Haplogroup A and Haplogroup BT. Subclades A1b and A1a-T now descend directly from the root of the tree. The rearrangement of the Y-chromosome family tree implies that lineages classified as Haplogroup A do not necessarily form a monophyletic clade. Haplogroup A therefore refers to a collection of lineages that do not possess the markers that define Haplogroup BT, though many lineages within haplogroup A are only very distantly related.

The M91 and P97 mutations distinguish Haplogroup A from Haplogroup BT. Within Haplogroup A chromosomes, the M91 marker consists of a stretch of 8 T nucleobase units. In Haplogroup BT and chimpanzee chromosomes, this marker consists of 9 T nucleobase units. This pattern suggested that the 9T stretch of Haplogroup BT was the ancestral version and that Haplogroup A was formed by the deletion of one nucleobase.

But according to Cruciani et al. 2011, the region surrounding the M91 marker is a mutational hotspot prone to recurrent mutations. It is therefore possible that the 8T stretch of Haplogroup A may be the ancestral state of M91 and the 9T of Haplogroup BT may be the derived state that arose by an insertion of 1T. This would explain why subclades A1b and A1a-T, the deepest branches of Haplogroup A, both possess the 8T stretch. Furthermore, Cruciani et al. 2011 determined that the P97 marker, which is also used to identify haplogroup A, possessed the ancestral state in haplogroup A but the derived state in Haplogroup BT.

=== Phylogenetic trees ===
This phylogenetic tree of haplogroup subclades is based on the Y-Chromosome Consortium (YCC) Tree, the ISOGG Y-DNA Haplogroup Tree, and subsequent published research.

Y-chromosomal Adam

- A0 (formerly A1b) (P305, V148, V149, V154, V164, V166, V172, V173, V177, V190, V196, V223, V225, V229, V233, V239)
- A1 (A1a-T according to Cruciani 2011) (L985, L989, L990, L1002, L1003, L1004, L1009, L1013, L1053, V161, V168, V171, V174, V203, V238, V241, V250, V238, V241, V250)
  - A1a (M31, P82, V4, V14, V15, V25, V26, V28, V30, V40, V48, V53, V57, V58, V63, V76, V191, V201, V204, V214, V215, V236)
  - A1b (A2-T according to Cruciani 2011) (P108, V221)
    - A1b1 (L419)
      - A1b1a (V50, V82, V198, V224)
        - A1b1a1 formerly A2 (M14, M23, L968/M29/P3/PN3, M71, M135, M141, M206, M276/P247, M277/P248, MEH1, P4, P5, P36.1, Page71, Page87, Page95)
          - A1b1a1a (M6, M196)
            - A1b1a1a1 (M212)
              - A1b1a1a1a formerly A2a (M114)
              - A1b1a1a1b formerly A2b (P28)
              - A1b1a1a1c formerly A2c (P262)
      - A1b1b formerly A3 (M32)
        - A1b1b1 formerly A3a (M28, M59)
        - A1b1b2 formerly A3b (M144, M190, M220, P289)
          - A1b1b2a formerly A3b1 (M51, P100, P291)
            - A1b1b2a1 formerly A3b1a (P71, P102)
          - A1b1b2b formerly A3b2 (M13, M127, M202, M219, M305):
            - A1b1b2b1 (M118)
    - BT (M42, M94, M139, M299, M60, M181/Page32, P85, P90, P97, Page65.1/SRY1532.1/SRY10831.1, V21, V29, V31, V59, V64, V102, V187, V202, V216, V235)

== See also ==
=== Genetics ===
- African admixture in Europe
- Genetic genealogy
- Haplogroup
- Haplotype
- Human Y-chromosome DNA haplogroup
- Molecular phylogenetics
- Paragroup
- Subclade
- Y-chromosome haplogroups in populations of the world
- Y-DNA haplogroups by ethnic group
- Y-DNA haplogroups in populations of Sub-Saharan Africa

=== Y-DNA A subclades ===
- A-M114
- A-M118
- A-M13
- A-M171
- A-M28
- A-M31
- A-M32
- A-M51
- A-M6
- A-P28
