= Genetic history of Southern Africa =

Southern African genetic history

The genetic history of Southern Africa encompasses the genetic history of the people of Southern Africa. The Sahara served as a trans-regional passageway and place of dwelling for people in Africa during various humid phases and periods throughout the history of Africa.

== Archaic human DNA ==
While Denisovan and Neanderthal ancestry in non-Africans outside of Africa are more certain, archaic human ancestry in Africans is less certain and is too early to be established with certainty.

== Ancient DNA ==
Three Later Stone Age hunter-gatherers carried ancient DNA similar to Khoisan-speaking hunter-gatherers. Prior to the Bantu migration into the region, as evidenced by ancient DNA from Botswana, East African herders migrated into Southern Africa. Out of four Iron Age Bantu agriculturalists of West African origin, two earlier agriculturalists carried ancient DNA similar to Tsonga and Venda peoples and the two later agriculturalists carried ancient DNA similar to Nguni people; this indicates that there were various movements of peoples in the overall Bantu migration, which resulted in increased interaction and admixing between Bantu-speaking peoples and Khoisan-speaking peoples.

=== Botswana ===
At Nqoma, in Botswana, an individual, dated to the Early Iron Age (900 BP), carried haplogroup L2a1f.

At Taukome, in Botswana, an individual, dated to the Early Iron Age (1100 BP), carried haplogroups E1b1a1 (E-M2, E-Z1123) and L0d3b1.

At Xaro, in Botswana, there were two individuals, dated to the Early Iron Age (1400 BP); one carried haplogroups E1b1a1a1c1a and L3e1a2, and another carried haplogroups E1b1b1b2b (E-M293, E-CTS10880) and L0k1a2.

=== Malawi ===
==== Fingira ====
At Fingira rockshelter, in Malawi, an individual, dated between 6179 BP and 2341 BP, carried haplogroups B2 and L0d1.

At Fingira, in Malawi, an individual, estimated to date between 6175 BP and 5913 BP, carried haplogroups BT and L0d1b2b.

At Fingira, in Malawi, an individual, estimated to date between 6177 BP and 5923 BP, carried haplogroups BT and L0d1c.

At Fingira, in Malawi, an individual, estimated to date between 2676 BP and 2330 BP, carried haplogroup L0f.

==== Chencherere ====
At Chencherere, in Malawi, an individual, estimated to date between 5400 BP and 4800 BP, carried haplogroup L0k2.

At Chencherere, in Malawi, an individual, estimated to date between 5293 BP and 4979 BP, carried haplogroup L0k1.

==== Hora ====
At Hora 1 rockshelter, in Malawi, an individual, dated between 16,897 BP and 15,827 BP, carried haplogroups B2b and L5b.

At Hora 1 rockshelter, in Malawi, an individual, dated between 16,424 BP and 14,029 BP, carried haplogroups B2b1a2~ and L0d3/L0d3b.

At Hora, in Malawi, an individual, estimated to date between 10,000 BP and 5000 BP, carried haplogroups BT and L0k2.

At Hora, in Malawi, an individual, estimated to date between 8173 BP and 7957 BP, carried haplogroup L0a2.

=== South Africa ===
At Doonside, in South Africa, an individual, estimated to date between 2296 BP and 1910 BP, carried haplogroup L0d2.

At Champagne Castle, in South Africa, an individual, estimated to date between 448 BP and 282 BP, carried haplogroup L0d2a1a.

At Eland Cave, in South Africa, an individual, estimated to date between 533 BP and 453 BP, carried haplogroup L3e3b1.

At Mfongosi, in South Africa, an individual, estimated to date between 448 BP and 308 BP, carried haplogroup L3e1b2.

At Newcastle, in South Africa, an individual, estimated to date between 508 BP and 327 BP, carried haplogroup L3e2b1a2.

At St. Helena, in South Africa, an individual, estimated to date between 2241 BP and 1965 BP, carried haplogroups A1b1b2a and L0d2c1.

At Faraoskop Rock Shelter, in South Africa, an individual, estimated to date between 2017 BP and 1748 BP, carried haplogroups A1b1b2a and L0d1b2b1b.

At Kasteelberg, in South Africa, an individual, estimated to date between 1282 BP and 1069 BP, carried haplogroup L0d1a1a.

At Vaalkrans Shelter, in South Africa, an individual, estimated to date to 200 BP, is predominantly related to Khoisan speakers, partly related (15–32%) to East Africans, and carried haplogroups L0d3b1.

==== Ballito Bay ====
At Ballito Bay, South Africa, an individual, estimated to date between 2149 BP and 1932 BP, carried haplogroups A1b1b2 and L0d2a1.

At Ballito Bay, South Africa, an individual, estimated to date between 1986 BP and 1831 BP, carried haplogroups A1b1b2 and L0d2c1.

At Ballito Bay, South Africa, Ballito Boy, estimated to date 1,980 ± 20 cal BP, was found to have Rickettsia felis.

=== Zambia ===
At Kalemba rockshelter, in Zambia, an individual, dated between 5285 BP and 4975 BP, carried haplogroup L0d1b2b.

== Y-chromosomal DNA ==
Various Y chromosome studies show that the San carry some of the most divergent (oldest) human Y-chromosome haplogroups. These haplogroups are specific sub-groups of haplogroups A and B, the two earliest branches on the human Y-chromosome tree.

== Mitochondrial DNA ==
In 200,000 BP, Africans (e.g., Khoisan of Southern Africa) bearing haplogroup L0 diverged from other Africans bearing haplogroup L1′6, which tend to be northward of Southern Africa. Between 130,000 BP and 75,000 BP, behavioral modernity emerged among Southern Africans and long-term interactions between the regions of Southern Africa and Eastern Africa became established.

Mitochondrial DNA studies also provide evidence that the San carry high frequencies of the earliest haplogroup branches in the human mitochondrial DNA tree. This DNA is inherited only from one's mother. The most divergent (oldest) mitochondrial haplogroup, L0d, has been identified at its highest frequencies in the southern African San groups.

== Autosomal DNA ==
From the region of Kenya and Tanzania to South Africa, eastern Bantu-speaking Africans constitute a north to south genetic cline; additionally, from eastern Africa to toward southern Africa, evidence of genetic homogeneity is indicative of a serial founder effect and admixture events having occurred between Bantu-speaking Africans and other African populations by the time the Bantu migration had spanned into South Africa.

Henn et al. (2011) found that the ǂKhomani San, as well as the Sandawe and Hadza peoples of Tanzania, were the most genetically diverse of any living humans studied. This high degree of genetic diversity hints at the origin of anatomically modern humans.

== Medical DNA ==
Among the ancient DNA from three hunter-gatherers sharing genetic similarity with San people and four Iron Age agriculturalists, their SNPs indicated that they bore variants for resistance against sleeping sickness and Plasmodium vivax. In particular, two out of the four Iron Age agriculturalists bore variants for resistance against sleeping sickness and three out of the four Iron Age agriculturalists bore Duffy negative variants for resistance against malaria. In contrast to the Iron Age agriculturalists, from among the San-related hunter-gatherers, a six-year-old boy may have died from schistosomiasis. In Botswana, a man, who dates to 1400 BP, may have also carried the Duffy negative variant for resistance against malaria.

The genomes of Africans commonly found to undergo adaptation are regulatory DNA, and many cases of adaptation found among Africans relate to diet, physiology, and evolutionary pressures from pathogens. Throughout Sub-Saharan Africa, genetic adaptation (e.g., rs334 mutation, Duffy blood group, increased rates of G6PD deficiency, sickle cell disease) to malaria has been found among Sub-Saharan Africans, which may have initially developed in 7300 BP. Sub-Saharan Africans have more than 90% of the Duffy-null genotype. In the Kalahari Desert region of Africa, various possible genetic adaptations (e.g., adiponectin, body mass index, metabolism) have been found among the ǂKhomani people. Sub-Saharan Africans have more than 90% of the Duffy-null genotype. In South Africa, genetic adaptation (e.g., rs28647531 on chromosome 4q22) and strong susceptibility to tuberculosis has been found among Coloureds.
