= Prehistoric Southern Africa =

Prehistory of the Southern African subregion of the African continent

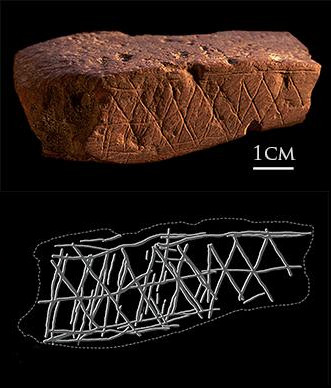
Patterned ochre stone at Blombos cave, 70,000 BP

The prehistory of Southern Africa spans from the earliest human presence in the region until the emergence of the Iron Age in Southern Africa. In 1,000,000 BP, hominins controlled fire at Wonderwerk Cave, South Africa. Ancestors of the Khoisan may have expanded from East Africa or Central Africa into Southern Africa before 150,000 BP, possibly as early as before 260,000 BP. Prehistoric West Africans may have diverged into distinct ancestral groups of modern West Africans and Bantu-speaking peoples in Cameroon, and, subsequently, around 5000 BP, the Bantu-speaking peoples migrated into other parts of Sub-Saharan Africa (e.g., Central African Republic, African Great Lakes, South Africa).

== Early Stone Age ==
In 1,000,000 BP, hominins controlled fire at Wonderwerk Cave, South Africa.

== Middle Stone Age ==
Ancestors of the Khoisan may have expanded from East Africa or Central Africa into Southern Africa before 150,000 BP, possibly as early as before 260,000 BP. Due to their early expansion and separation, ancestors of the Khoisan may have been the largest population among anatomically modern humans, from their early separation before 150,000 BP until the Out of Africa migration in 70,000 BP.

In 200,000 BP, Africans (e.g., Khoisan of Southern Africa) bearing haplogroup L0 diverged from other Africans bearing haplogroup L1′6, which tend to be northward of Southern Africa. Between 130,000 BP and 75,000 BP, behavioral modernity emerged among Southern Africans and long-term interactions between the regions of Southern Africa and Eastern Africa became established.

By at least 170,000 BP, amid the Middle Stone Age, Southern Africans cooked and ate Hypoxis angustifolia rhizomes at Border Cave, South Africa, which may have provided carbohydrates for their migratory activities.

Among the Klasies River Caves, finger bones (manual distal phalanges), which have been dated between 100,000 BP and 90,000 BP, were recovered from the Witness Baulk in Cave 1. These bones are from an adult individual and appear smaller in size than modern human populations; they are also not comparable to Neanderthal phalanges. These phalanges are however similar to phalanges originating in Die Kelders cave which the authors suggest are more comparable to Holocene Khoesan populations.

In 92,000 BP, amid the Middle Stone Age, Malawian foragers utilized fire to influence and alter their surrounding environment.

At Blombos Cave, small rock fragments with drawn abstractions were "a prime indicator of modern cognition" inscribed by Southern Africans in 73,000 BP. At PP13B, the evidence for symbolic behaviour comes in the form of scraped and ground ochre (usually referred to as limonite bearing powders) that may have been used to form a pigment for body painting. This is similar to more complex ochre utilisation known from Blombos Cave slightly farther to the west at roughly 70,000 years ago. These discoveries contradict the classical hypothesis that the modern behaviour emerged only 40,000 years ago and was reached through a "large cultural leap". The harsh climate and reduced food resources may have been why people moved to the shore at Pinnacle Point, where they could eat marine creatures like shellfish, whale, and seal.

Between 65,000 BP and 37,000 BP, amid the Middle to Late Stone Age, Southern Africans developed the bow and arrow.

The Lebombo bone, which is from the Swaziland and South African mountain region and may be the oldest known mathematical artifact, consists of 29 distinct notches that were deliberately cut into a baboon's fibula and has been dated to 35,000 BCE.

== Later Stone Age ==
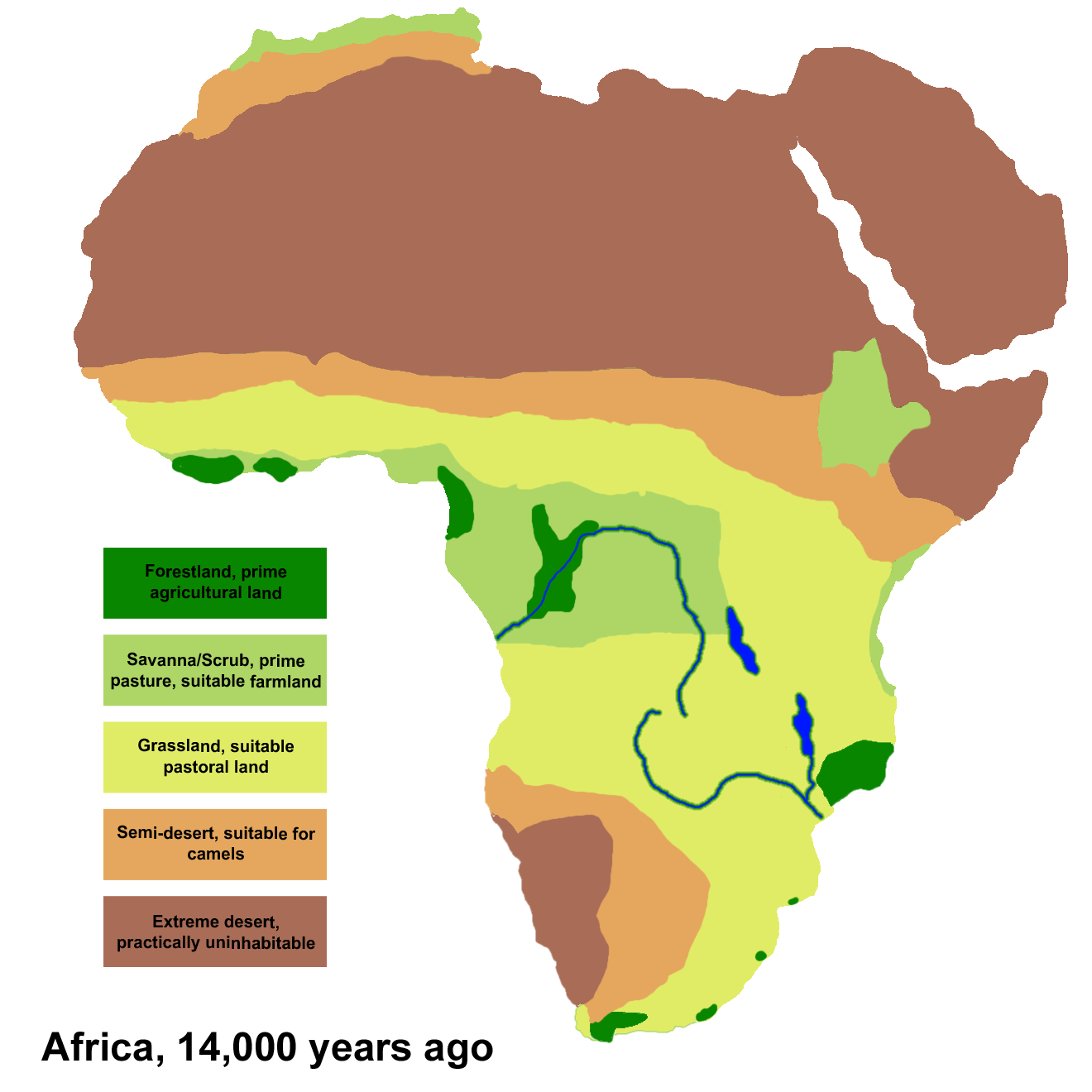
Africa in 12,000 BCE

The San populations, ancestral to the Khoisan, were spread throughout much of Southern Africa and Eastern Africa throughout the Later Stone Age in 75,000 BP. In 20,000 BP, these populations, who carried haplogroup L0d, may have further expanded, which may also be connected with the spread of click consonants into East African languages (Hadza language).

The Later Stone Age Sangoan industry occupied Southern Africa in areas where annual rainfall is less than a meter (1000 mm; 39.4 in).

Various examples of early human technology have been found at Sibudu Cave:

- A bone point, a possible arrowhead that pushes back the origin of bow and bone arrow technology to 61,000 BP, at least 20,000 years earlier than the previous earliest example;
- The earliest known bone needle, dated to 61,000 BP, with wear similar to that found in bone needles used to puncture animal hide;
- The earliest example of a compound glue (plant gum and red ochre), used for hafting stone points into wood handles to create spears — dated no later than 71,000 BP; and
- Shell beads, although of a more recent date than those found at Blombos cave 71,000 BP for the Sibudu beads in comparison to 75,000 BP for those at Blombos;
- An example of the use of bedding, dating back to approximately 77,000 BP, with Cape laurel being used on top, probably for its insecticidal properties;
- The earliest use of milk (casein) as a paint binder in a milk-ochre mixture 49,000 BP.
- Dried fruits, carbonised and uncarbonised seeds (uncarbonised seeds consist of Antidesma venosum, Croton sylvaticus, Bridelia micrantha and many others) and nuts were found at Sibudu Cave belonging to the Middle Stone Age, from earlier than 60,000 BP to approximately 37,000 BP.

Like the earlier Stillbay industry, creators of Howiesons Poort artifacts seem to have engaged in symbolic behavior, having left behind engraved ochre, ostrich eggshells, and shell beads; the site of Howiesons Poort dates to at least 50,000 BP. There is a particularly abundant and diverse use of ochre as a pigment for objects or skin, which has been interpreted as reflecting an increasingly complex symbolic culture.

At Border Cave, a nearly complete infant skeleton, which was accompanied by perforated Conus bairstowi shells that dated to ~33,570 ± 120 BP, likely came from the eastern Cape coast. The infant burial may represent one of the earliest southern African examples of burial ornamentation.

In 19,000 BP, Africans, bearing haplogroup E1b1a-V38, likely traversed across the Sahara, from east to west.

While the Niger-Congo migration may have been from West Africa into Kordofan, possibly from Kordofan, Sudan, Niger-Congo speakers (e.g., Mande), accompanied by undomesticated helmeted guineafowls, may have traversed into West Africa, domesticated the helmeted guineafowls by 3000 BCE, and via the Bantu expansion, traversed into other parts of Sub-Saharan Africa (e.g., Central Africa, East Africa, Southern Africa).

According to Steverding (2020), while not definite: Near the African Great Lakes, schistosomes (e.g., S. mansoni, S. haematobium) underwent evolution. Subsequently, there was an expansion alongside the Nile River. From Egypt, the presence of schistosomes may have expanded, via migratory Yoruba people, into Western Africa. Thereafter, schistosomes may have expanded, via migratory Bantu-speaking peoples, into the rest of Sub-Saharan Africa (e.g., Southern Africa, Central Africa).

At Hora 1 rockshelter, in Malawi, an individual, dated between 16,897 BP and 15,827 BP, carried haplogroups B2b and L5b.

At Hora 1 rockshelter, in Malawi, an individual, dated between 16,424 BP and 14,029 BP, carried haplogroups B2b1a2~ and L0d3/L0d3b.

At Hora, in Malawi, an individual, estimated to date between 10,000 BP and 5000 BP, carried haplogroups BT and L0k2.

Rock art occurs in the form of parietal paintings within the first 40 m (130 ft) from the entrance of Wonderwerk Cave, possibly all less than 1000 years old, and small engraved stones found within the deposit, mainly from the Later Stone Age sequence where they date back some 10,500 years.

During the early period of the Holocene, in 9000 BP, Khoisan-related peoples admixed with the ancestors of the Igbo people, possibly in the western Sahara.

At Hora, in Malawi, an individual, estimated to date between 8173 BP and 7957 BP, carried haplogroup L0a2.

The genomes of Africans commonly found to undergo adaptation are regulatory DNA, and many cases of adaptation found among Africans relate to diet, physiology, and evolutionary pressures from pathogens. Throughout Sub-Saharan Africa, genetic adaptation (e.g., rs334 mutation, Duffy blood group, increased rates of G6PD deficiency, sickle cell disease) to malaria has been found among Sub-Saharan Africans, which may have initially developed in 7300 BP. Sub-Saharan Africans have more than 90% of the Duffy-null genotype. In the Kalahari Desert region of Africa, various possible genetic adaptations (e.g., adiponectin, body mass index, metabolism) have been found among the ǂKhomani people. Sub-Saharan Africans have more than 90% of the Duffy-null genotype. In South Africa, genetic adaptation (e.g., rs28647531 on chromosome 4q22) and strong susceptibility to tuberculosis has been found among Coloureds.

At Fingira rockshelter, in Malawi, an individual, dated between 6179 BP and 2341 BP, carried haplogroups B2 and L0d1.

At Fingira, in Malawi, an individual, estimated to date between 6177 BP and 5923 BP, carried haplogroups BT and L0d1c.

At Fingira, in Malawi, an individual, estimated to date between 6175 BP and 5913 BP, carried haplogroups BT and L0d1b2b.

Bantu-speaking peoples migrated, along with their ceramics, from West Africa into other areas of Sub-Saharan Africa. The Kalundu ceramic type may have spread into Southeastern Africa. Additionally, the Eastern African Urewe ceramic type of Lake Victoria may have spread, via African shores near the Indian Ocean, as the Kwale ceramic type, and spread, via Zimbabwe, Zambia, and Malawi, as the Nkope ceramic type. From the region of Kenya and Tanzania to South Africa, eastern Bantu-speaking Africans constitute a north to south genetic cline; additionally, from eastern Africa to toward southern Africa, evidence of genetic homogeneity is indicative of a serial founder effect and admixture events having occurred between Bantu-speaking Africans and other African populations by the time the Bantu migration had spanned into South Africa. Though some may have been created later, the earlier red finger-painted rock art may have been created between 6000 BP and 1800 BP, to the south of Kei River and Orange River by Khoisan hunter-gatherer-herders, in Malawi and Zambia by considerably dark-skinned, occasionally bearded, bow-and-arrow-wielding Akafula hunter-gatherers who resided in Malawi until 19th century CE, and in Transvaal by the Vhangona people. Bantu-speaking farmers, or their Proto-Bantu progenitors, created the later white finger-painted rock art in some areas of Tanzania, Malawi, Angola, Zambia, and Zimbabwe, as well as in the northern regions of Mozambique, Botswana, and Transvaal. The Transvaal (e.g., Soutpansberg, Waterberg) rock art was specifically created by Sotho-speakers (e.g., Birwa, Koni, Tlokwa) and Venda people. Concentric circles, stylized humans, stylized animals, ox-wagons, saurian figures, Depictions of crocodiles and snakes were included in the white finger-painted rock art tradition, both of which were associated with rainmaking and crocodiles in particular, were also associated with fertility. The white finger-painted rock art may have been created for reasons relating to initiation rites and puberty rituals. Depictions from the rock art tradition of Bantu-speaking farmers have been found on divination-related items (e.g., drums, initiation figurines, initiation masks); fertility terracotta masks from Transvaal have been dated to the 1st millennium CE. Along with Iron Age archaeological sites from the 1st millennium CE, this indicates that white finger-painted rock art tradition may have been spanned from the Early Iron Age to the Later Iron Age. Down-headed animals, which appear in South African rock art, and portray shamanic animal sacrifice as a rainfall ritual, also appear in Round Head rock art.

At Chencherere, in Malawi, an individual, estimated to date between 5400 BP and 4800 BP, carried haplogroup L0k2.

At Chencherere, in Malawi, an individual, estimated to date between 5293 BP and 4979 BP, carried haplogroup L0k1.

== Pastoral Neolithic ==
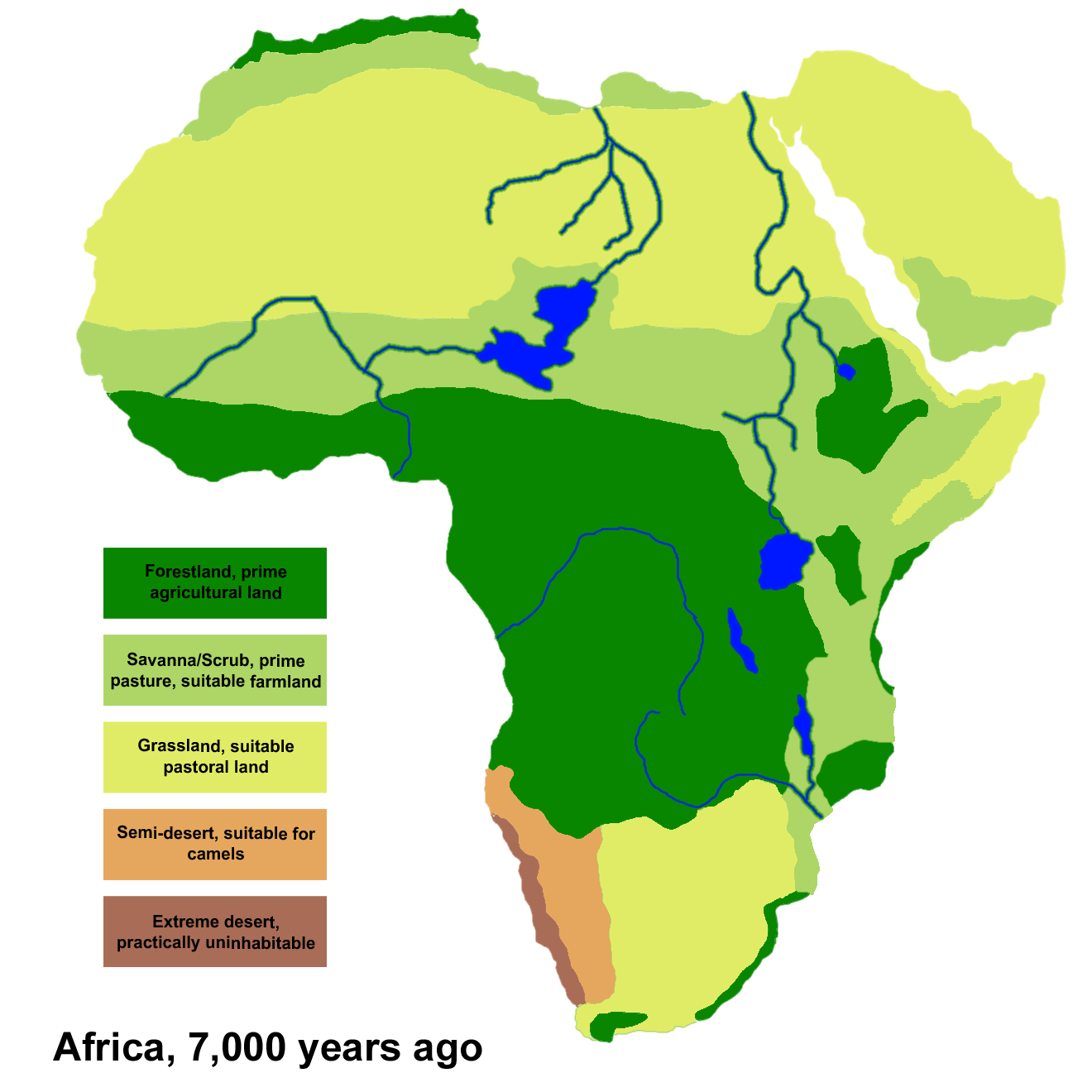
Africa in 5000 BCE

Three Later Stone Age hunter-gatherers carried ancient DNA similar to Khoisan-speaking hunter-gatherers. Prior to the Bantu migration into the region, as evidenced by ancient DNA from Botswana, East African herders migrated into Southern Africa. Out of four Iron Age Bantu agriculturalists of West African origin, two earlier agriculturalists carried ancient DNA similar to Tsonga and Venda peoples and the two later agriculturalists carried ancient DNA similar to Nguni people; this indicates that there were various movements of peoples in the overall Bantu migration, which resulted in increased interaction and admixing between Bantu-speaking peoples and Khoisan-speaking peoples. At Xaro, in Botswana, there were two individuals, dated to the Early Iron Age (1400 BP); one carried haplogroups E1b1a1a1c1a and L3e1a2, and another carried haplogroups E1b1b1b2b (E-M293, E-CTS10880) and L0k1a2. At Taukome, in Botswana, an individual, dated to the Early Iron Age (1100 BP), carried haplogroups E1b1a1 (E-M2, E-Z1123) and L0d3b1. At Nqoma, in Botswana, an individual, dated to the Early Iron Age (900 BP), carried haplogroup L2a1f.

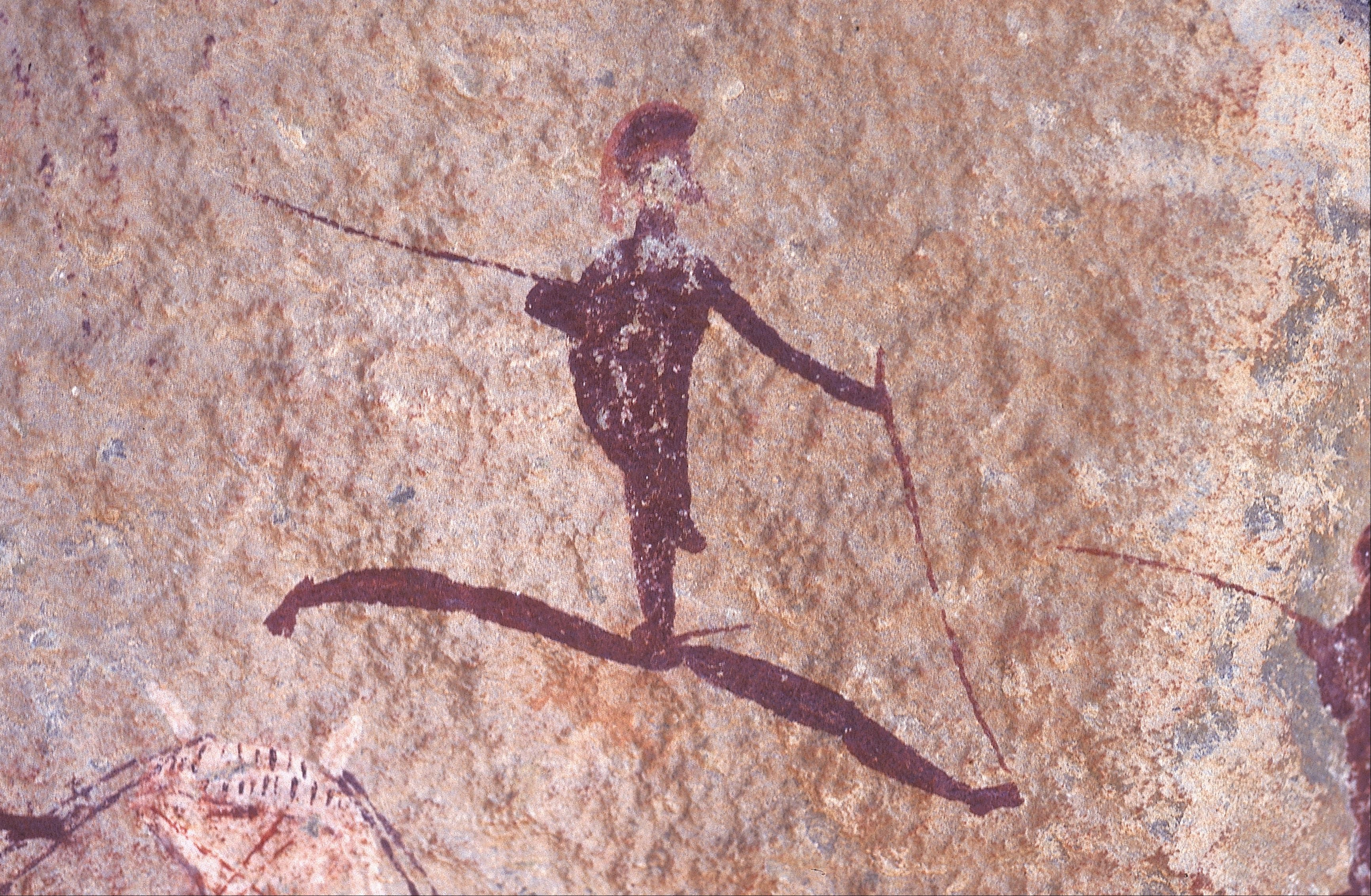
Eland Main Panel by Southern San, 4000 BP - 100 BP

At Fingira, in Malawi, an individual, estimated to date between 2676 BP and 2330 BP, carried haplogroup L0f.

As pastoralists and Bantu-speaking agro-pastoralists may have begun arriving in Southern Africa in 2300 BP, Bantu-speaking agropastoralists and Khoisan hunter-gatherers may have admixed with one another, resulting in the development of blended agro-pastoralist and hunter-gatherer communities that languages with click consonants and Khoisan loan words; these amalgamated communities later would develop into the modern indigenous communities (e.g., Xhosa, Sotho, Tswana, Zulu people) of South Africa, Botswana, and Namibia.

At Doonside, in South Africa, an individual, estimated to date between 2296 BP and 1910 BP, carried haplogroup L0d2.

At St. Helena, in South Africa, an individual, estimated to date between 2241 BP and 1965 BP, carried haplogroups A1b1b2a and L0d2c1.

At Ballito Bay, in South Africa, an individual, estimated to date between 2149 BP and 1932 BP, carried haplogroups A1b1b2 and L0d2a1.

At Faraoskop Rock Shelter, in South Africa, an individual, estimated to date between 2017 BP and 1748 BP, carried haplogroups A1b1b2a and L0d1b2b1b.

At Ballito Bay, in South Africa, an individual, estimated to date between 1986 BP and 1831 BP, carried haplogroups A1b1b2 and L0d2c1.

At Ballito Bay, South Africa, Ballito Boy, estimated to date 1,980 ± 20 cal BP, was found to have Rickettsia felis.

At Kasteelberg, in South Africa, an individual, estimated to date between 1282 BP and 1069 BP, carried haplogroup L0d1a1a.

At Eland Cave, in South Africa, an individual, estimated to date between 533 BP and 453 BP, carried haplogroup L3e3b1.

At Newcastle, in South Africa, an individual, estimated to date between 508 BP and 327 BP, carried haplogroup L3e2b1a2.

At Mfongosi, in South Africa, an individual, estimated to date between 448 BP and 308 BP, carried haplogroup L3e1b2.

At Champagne Castle, in South Africa, an individual, estimated to date between 448 BP and 282 BP, carried haplogroup L0d2a1a.

At Vaalkrans Shelter, in South Africa, an individual, estimated to date to 200 BP, is predominantly related to Khoisan speakers, partly related (15% - 32%) to East Africans, and carried haplogroups L0d3b1.
