= Haplogroup B =

Haplogroup B may refer to:

- Haplogroup B (mtDNA), a human mitochondrial DNA (mtDNA) haplogroup
- Haplogroup B (Y-DNA), a human Y-chromosome (Y-DNA) haplogroup
