= Haplogroup A =

Haplogroup A may refer to:

- Haplogroup A (mtDNA), a human mitochondrial DNA (mtDNA) haplogroup
- Haplogroup A (Y-DNA), a human Y-chromosome (Y-DNA) haplogroup
