= Synodontis polyodon =

Conservation status
- Least Concern (IUCN 3.1)

Scientific classification
- Kingdom: Animalia
- Phylum: Chordata
- Class: Actinopterygii
- Order: Siluriformes
- Family: Mochokidae
- Genus: Synodontis
- Species: S. polyodon

Binomial name
- Synodontis polyodon Vaillant, 1895

Species of fish

Synodontis polyodon is a species of upside-down catfish native to Gabon where it occurs in the Ogowe River basin. It was first described by French zoologist Léon Vaillant in 1895, based upon a holotype discovered in the Ogooué River, near Adouma, Gabon. The specific name "polyodon" comes from the Greek words poly, meaning "many" and odon, meaning "tooth", referring to the many teeth in this species.

== Description ==
The body of the fish is brownish with traces of dark spots forming four or five transverse series.

Like other members of the genus, this fish has a humeral process, which is a bony spike that is attached to a hardened head cap on the fish and can be seen extending beyond the gill opening. The humeral process in this species is striated, keeled, long and slender, and acutely pointed at the end. The first ray of the dorsal fin has a hardened first ray which is smooth on the front and slightly serrated on the back. The pectoral spines are as long as the head and are strongly serrated on both sides, especially the inner side. The caudal fin is deeply forked. It has short, cone-shaped teeth in the upper jaw. In the lower jaw, about 75 teeth are arranged in a long series. The fish has one pair of long maxillary barbels, extending a bit beyond the base of the pectoral spine, and two pairs of mandibular barbels that are often branched. The adipose fin is 3 1/2 times as long as it is high.

This species grows to a length of up to 31.4 centimetres (12.4 in) SL

== Habitat ==
In the wild, the species inhabits tropical freshwaters. it occurs in the Ogowe River basin in Gabon.
