= Okandé =

The Okandé are a people of north-eastern Gabon who belong to the Mèmbè language group (Okandè, Apindzi, Simba, Vové, Tsogho, Evia and Kotakota). Their language overlaps that of the Apindzi and the Simba about 80/86% according to professor Van Der Veen. Their estimated population of 2,000 persons (in 2003) live in the Lopé region in Ogooué-Ivindo. The Mwiri, a male initiation institution, still plays an important role in the traditional social and religious life of the Okandé.

While their history is little known today, the archives do speak of them. The Okandè, fierce conservators of their environment, through their initiation rites, (Douwa, Diyandzi, Ghétolè, Bwété, Mwiri) were formerly dubbed the "kings of the Ogooué, the vainquishers of the rapids", better known than the Adouma and the Sisiwu, have taught their traditions, such as navigation of the Ogooué, okouyi dancing, Mvudi, Bodi, Mboudi, Mouiri, Ndjèmbè and others) to the Galois, Enènga, Aduma, Mbangwè and Sisiwu. Seasoned canoers, the Okandè helped the explorer Pierre Savorgnan de Brazza and his successors up the Ogooué to its source towards the end of the 19th century. They were longtime slave traders; the Adouma came down the Ogooué to the Lopé to sell them slaves, and in turn the Okandé brought them in pirogues specially adapted to the rocks and rivers of the Ogooué to sell them to the Enènga of Lambaréné.

Only the Okandè and the Kotakota (derived from the Apinzi of the Ogooué) of Ndjolé, or, rarely, the Enènga, attempted the Ogooué in its most complex stretch, from Lambaréné to Booué, which the Galois and Enènga called "Orèmbo Okandè", or the river of the Okandè. The Okandè named the river the Ogooué, and also, between Lambaréné and Booué, many watercourses, islets, rapids and so on bear names given to them by the piroguiers of the Okandè, such as Talaghougha, Abanga, Offoué, Okano, Lélédi, Ivindo, Booué, Ngomo, and Ashouka.

The banks of the Okandé are covered in virgin forests interrupted at lengthy intervals by clearings where the Akellas have established small villages, very useful to travelers for the purchase of provisions.Hippopotamuses abound in the Okandé. Beyond Samiketa the riverbanks get much higher.

== Language ==
In the classification of Bantu languages established by Malcolm Guthrie, Mokande-Kande belongs to the Tsogo (B30) language group and is coded B32.

== Notes and references ==
=== Bibliography ===
- (English) David E. Gardinier and Douglas A. Yates, Historical dictionary of Gabon, Scarecrow Press, Lanham, Md., Plymouth, 2006 (3rd ed.) ISBN 9780810849181
- (English) James Stuart Olson, "Okandé", in The Peoples of Africa: An Ethnohistorical Dictionary, Greenwood Publishing Group, 1996, p. 464 ISBN 9780313279188

=== Related articles ===
- Demographics of Gabon
- List of ethnic groups of Africa
