= Y-chromosomal Adam =

Patrilineal most recent common ancestor of all living humans

Haplogroup Y-MRCA
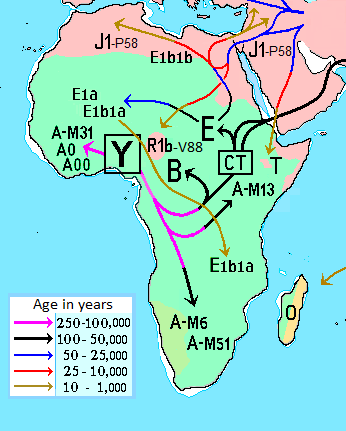
- Possible time of origin: 300,000–160,000 BP
- Possible place of origin: Coastal Central-Northwest Africa
- Ancestor: Ante
- Descendants: Primary: A

In human genetics, the Y-chromosomal Adam (more technically known as the Y-chromosomal most recent common ancestor, shortened to Y-MRCA), is the patrilineal most recent common ancestor (MRCA) from whom all currently living humans are descended. He is the most recent male from whom all living humans are descended through an unbroken line of their male ancestors. The term Y-MRCA reflects the fact that the Y chromosomes of all currently living human males are directly derived from the Y chromosome of this remote ancestor.

The analogous concept of the matrilineal most recent common ancestor is known as "Mitochondrial Eve" (mt-MRCA, named for the matrilineal transmission of mtDNA), the most recent woman from whom all living humans are descended matrilineally. As with "Mitochondrial Eve", the title of "Y-chromosomal Adam" is not permanently fixed to a single individual, but can advance over the course of human history as paternal lineages become extinct.

Estimates of the time when Y-MRCA lived have also shifted as modern knowledge of human ancestry changes. For example, in 2013, the discovery of a previously unknown Y-chromosomal haplogroup was announced, which resulted in a slight adjustment of the estimated age of the human Y-MRCA.

By definition, it is not necessary that the Y-MRCA and the mt-MRCA should have lived at the same time. While estimates as of 2014 suggested the possibility that the two individuals may well have been roughly contemporaneous, the discovery of the archaic Y-haplogroup has pushed back the estimated age of the Y-MRCA beyond the most likely age of the mt-MRCA. As of 2015, estimates of the age of the Y-MRCA range around 200,000 to 300,000 years ago, roughly consistent with the emergence of anatomically modern humans.

Y-chromosomal data taken from a Neanderthal from El Sidrón, Spain, produced a Y-T-MRCA (time to Y-MRCA) of 588,000 years ago for Neanderthal and Homo sapiens patrilineages, dubbed ante Adam, and 275,000 years ago for Y-MRCA.

== Definition ==
Hominin timeline
← / Earlier apes; ← / Gorilla split; ← / Chimpanzee split; ← / Earliest bipedal; ← / Earliest sign of Ardipithecus; ← / Earliest sign of Australopithecus; ← / Earliest stone tools; ← / Earliest sign of Homo; ← / Dispersal beyond Africa; ← / Earliest fire / cooking; ← / Earliest rock art; ← / Earliest clothes; ← / Modern humans
(million years ago)

The Y-chromosomal most recent common ancestor is the most recent common ancestor of the Y-chromosomes found in currently living human males.

Due to the definition via the "currently living" population, the identity of a MRCA, and by extension of the human Y-MRCA, is time-dependent (it depends on the moment in time intended by the term "currently"). The MRCA of a population may move forward in time as archaic lineages within the population go extinct: once a lineage has died out, it is irretrievably lost. This mechanism can thus only shift the title of Y-MRCA forward in time. Such an event could be due to the total extinction of several basal haplogroups. The same holds for the concepts of matrilineal and patrilineal MRCAs: it follows from the definition of Y-MRCA that he had at least two sons who both have unbroken lineages that have survived to the present day. If the lineages of all but one of those sons die out, then the title of Y-MRCA shifts forward from the remaining son through his patrilineal descendants, until the first descendant is reached who had at least two sons who both have living, patrilineal descendants. The title of Y-MRCA is not permanently fixed to a single individual, and the Y-MRCA for any given population would himself have been part of a population which had its own, more remote, Y-MRCA.

Although the informal name "Y-chromosomal Adam" is a reference to the biblical Adam, this should not be misconstrued as implying that the bearer of the chromosome was the only human male alive during his time. His other male contemporaries may also have descendants alive today, but not, by definition, through solely patrilineal descent; in other words, none of them have an unbroken male line of descendants (son's son's son's … son) connecting them to currently living people.

By the nature of the concept of most recent common ancestors, these estimates can only represent a terminus ante quem ("limit before which"), until the genome of the entire population has been examined (in this case, the genome of all living humans).

== Age estimate ==
Estimates on the age of the Y-MRCA crucially depend on the most archaic known haplogroup extant in contemporary populations. As of 2018, this is haplogroup A00 (discovered in 2013). Age estimates based on this published during 2014–2015 range between 160,000 and 300,000 years, compatible with the time of emergence and early dispersal of Homo sapiens.

=== Method ===
In addition to the tendency of the title of Y-MRCA to shift forward in time, the estimate of the Y-MRCA's DNA sequence, his position in the family tree, the time when he lived, and his place of origin, are all subject to future revisions.

The following events would change the estimate of who the individual designated as Y-MRCA was:

- Further sampling of Y chromosomes could uncover previously unknown divergent lineages. If this happens, Y-chromosome lineages would converge on an individual who lived further back in time.
- The discovery of additional deep rooting mutations in known lineages could lead to a rearrangement of the family tree.
- Revision of the Y-chromosome mutation rate (see below) can change the estimate of the time when he lived.

The time when Y-MRCA lived is determined by applying a molecular clock to human Y-chromosomes. In contrast to mitochondrial DNA (mtDNA), which has a short sequence of 16,000 base pairs, and mutates frequently, the Y chromosome is significantly longer at 60 million base pairs, and has a lower mutation rate. These features of the Y chromosome have slowed down the identification of its polymorphisms; as a consequence, they have reduced the accuracy of Y-chromosome mutation rate estimates.

Methods of estimating the age of the Y-MRCA for a population of human males whose Y-chromosomes have been sequenced are based on applying the theories of molecular evolution to the Y chromosome. Unlike the autosomes, the human Y-chromosome does not recombine often with the X chromosome during meiosis, but is usually transferred intact from father to son; however, it can recombine with the X chromosome in the pseudoautosomal regions at the ends of the Y chromosome. Mutations occur periodically within the Y chromosome, and these mutations are passed on to males in subsequent generations.

These mutations can be used as markers to identify shared patrilineal relationships. Y chromosomes that share a specific mutation are referred to as haplogroups. Men belonging to a specific Y-DNA haplogroup share a common patrilineal ancestor who was the first to carry the defining mutation. A family tree of Y chromosomes can be constructed, with the mutations serving as branching points along lineages. The Y-MRCA is positioned at the root of the family tree, as the Y chromosomes of all living males are descended from his Y chromosome.

Researchers can reconstruct ancestral Y chromosome DNA sequences by reversing mutated DNA segments to their original condition. The most likely original or ancestral state of a DNA sequence is determined by comparing human DNA sequences with those of a closely related species, usually non-human primates such as chimpanzees and gorillas. By reversing known mutations in a Y-chromosome lineage, a hypothetical ancestral sequence for the MRCA, Y-chromosomal Adam, can be inferred.

Determining the Y-MRCA's DNA sequence, and the time when he lived, involves identifying the human Y-chromosome lineages that are most divergent from each other—the lineages that share the fewest mutations with each other when compared to a non-human primate sequence in a phylogenetic tree. The common ancestor of the most divergent lineages is therefore the common ancestor of all lineages.

=== History of estimates ===
Early estimates of the age for the Y-MRCA published during the 1990s ranged between roughly 200 and 300 thousand years ago (kya). Such estimates were later substantially revised downward, as in Thomson et al. 2000, which proposed an age of about 59,000. This date suggested that the Y-MRCA lived about 84,000 years after his female counterpart mt-MRCA (the matrilineal most recent common ancestor), who lived 150,000–200,000 years ago. This date also meant that Y-chromosomal Adam lived at a time very close to, and possibly after, the migration from Africa which is believed to have taken place 50,000–80,000 years ago. One explanation given for this discrepancy in the time depths of patrilineal vs. matrilineal lineages was that females have a better chance of reproducing than males due to the practice of polygyny. When a male individual has several wives, he has effectively prevented other males in the community from reproducing and passing on their Y chromosomes to subsequent generations. On the other hand, polygyny does not prevent most females in a community from passing on their mitochondrial DNA to subsequent generations. This differential reproductive success of males and females can lead to fewer male lineages relative to female lineages persisting into the future. These fewer male lineages are more sensitive to drift and would most likely coalesce on a more recent common ancestor. This would potentially explain the more recent dates associated with the Y-MRCA.

The "hyper-recent" estimate of significantly below 100 kya was again corrected upward in studies of the early 2010s, which ranged at about 120 kya to 160 kya. This revision was due to the rearrangement of the backbone of the Y-chromosome phylogeny following the resequencing of Haplogroup A lineages. In 2013, Francalacci et al. reported the sequencing of male-specific single-nucleotide Y-chromosome polymorphisms (MSY-SNPs) from 1204 Sardinian males, which indicated an estimate of 180,000 to 200,000 years for the common origin of all humans through paternal lineage. Also in 2013, Poznik et al. reported the Y-MRCA to have lived between 120,000 and 156,000 years ago, based on genome sequencing of 69 men from 9 different populations. In addition, the same study estimated the age of Mitochondrial Eve to about 99,000 and 148,000 years. As these ranges overlap for a time-range of 28,000 years (148 to 120 kya), the results of this study have been cast in terms of the possibility that "Genetic Adam and Eve may have walked on Earth at the same time" in the popular press.

The announcement by Mendez et al. of the discovery of a previously unknown lineage, haplogroup A00, in 2013, resulted in another shift in the estimate for the age of Y-chromosomal Adam. The authors estimated the split from the other haplogroups at 338,000 years ago (95% confidence interval 237–581 kya), but later Elhaik et al. (2014) dated it to between 163,900 and 260,200 years ago (95% CI), and Karmin et al. (2015) dated it to between 192,000 and 307,000 years ago (95% CI). The same study reports that non-African populations converge to a cluster of Y-MRCAs in a window close to 50 kya (out-of-Africa migration), and an additional bottleneck for non-African populations at about 10 kya, interpreted as reflecting cultural changes increasing the variance in male reproductive success (i.e. increased social stratification) in the Neolithic.

== Family tree ==
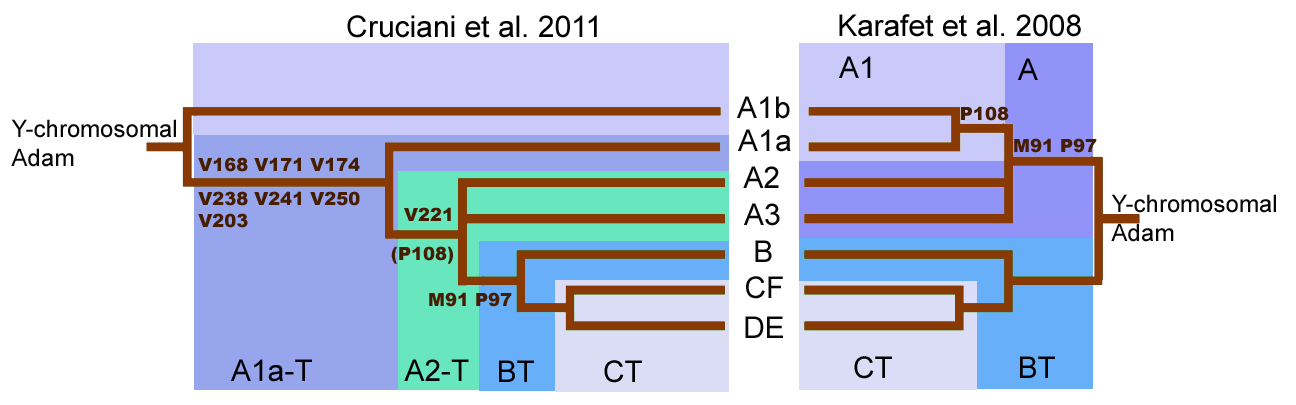
The revised root of the y-chromosome family tree by Cruciani et al. 2011 compared with the family tree from Karafet et al. 2008. It is now known that there is a haplogroup (A00) outside of this scheme. The group designated A1b here is now called A0, and "A1b" is now used for what is here called A2-T.

Initial sequencing (Karafet et al., 2008) of the human Y chromosome suggested that two most basal Y-chromosome lineages were Haplogroup A and Haplogroup BT. Haplogroup A is found at low frequencies in parts of Africa, but is common among certain hunter-gatherer groups. Haplogroup BT lineages represent the majority of African Y-chromosome lineages and virtually all non-African lineages. Y-chromosomal Adam was represented as the root of these two lineages. Haplogroup A and Haplogroup BT represented the lineages of Y-chromosomal Adam himself and of one of his sons, who had a new SNP.

Cruciani et al. 2011, determined that the deepest split in the Y-chromosome tree was found between two previously reported subclades of Haplogroup A, rather than between Haplogroup A and Haplogroup BT. Later, group A00 was found, outside of the previously known tree. The rearrangement of the Y-chromosome family tree implies that lineages classified as Haplogroup A do not necessarily form a monophyletic clade. Haplogroup A therefore refers to a collection of lineages that do not possess the markers that define Haplogroup BT, though Haplogroup A includes the most distantly related Y chromosomes.

The M91 and P97 mutations distinguish Haplogroup A from Haplogroup BT. Within Haplogroup A chromosomes, the M91 marker consists of a stretch of 8 T nucleobase units. In Haplogroup BT and chimpanzee chromosomes, this marker consists of 9 T nucleobase units. This pattern suggested that the 9T stretch of Haplogroup BT was the ancestral version and that Haplogroup A was formed by the deletion of one nucleobase. Haplogroups A1b and A1a were considered subclades of Haplogroup A as they both possessed the M91 with 8Ts.

But according to Cruciani et al. 2011, the region surrounding the M91 marker is a mutational hotspot prone to recurrent mutations. It is therefore possible that the 8T stretch of Haplogroup A may be the ancestral state of M91 and the 9T of Haplogroup BT may be the derived state that arose by an insertion of 1T. This would explain why subclades A1b and A1a-T, the deepest branches of Haplogroup A, both possess the same version of M91 with 8Ts. Furthermore, Cruciani et al. 2011 determined that the P97 marker, which is also used to identify Haplogroup A, possessed the ancestral state in Haplogroup A but the derived state in Haplogroup BT.

== Likely geographic origin ==
As current estimates on TMRCA converge with estimates for the age of anatomically modern humans and well predate the Out of Africa migration, geographical origin hypotheses continue to be limited to the African continent.

According to Cruciani et al. 2011, the most basal lineages have been detected in West, Northwest and Central Africa, suggesting plausibility for the Y-MRCA living in the general region of "Central-Northwest Africa".

Scozzari et al. (2012) agreed with a plausible placement in "the north-western quadrant of the African continent" for the emergence of the A1b haplogroup. The 2013 report of haplogroup A00 found among the Mbo people of western present-day Cameroon is also compatible with this picture.

The revision of Y-chromosomal phylogeny since 2011 has affected estimates for the likely geographical origin of Y-MRCA as well as estimates on time depth. By the same reasoning, future discovery of presently-unknown archaic haplogroups in living people would again lead to such revisions. In particular, the possible presence of between 1% and 4% Neanderthal-derived DNA in Eurasian genomes implies that the (unlikely) event of a discovery of a single living Eurasian male exhibiting a Neanderthal patrilineal line would immediately push back T-MRCA ("time to MRCA") to at least twice its current estimate. However, the discovery of a Neanderthal Y-chromosome by Mendez et al. suggests the extinction of Neanderthal patrilineages, as the lineage inferred from the Neanderthal sequence is outside of the range of contemporary human genetic variation. Questions of geographical origin would become part of the debate on Neanderthal evolution from Homo erectus.

== See also ==
- Adam's Curse (book by Bryan Sykes)
- Biblical Adam (Y-chromosomal Adam's namesake)
- Archaeogenetics
- San people
- Eurasian Adam
- Mitochondrial Eve
- Genealogical DNA test
- Genetic genealogy
- Genographic Project
- Human Y-chromosome DNA haplogroup
- Identical ancestors point
- Paternal mtDNA transmission
- Y-chromosomal Aaron
