= Haplogroup A (Y-DNA) =

Human Y-chromosome DNA haplogroup

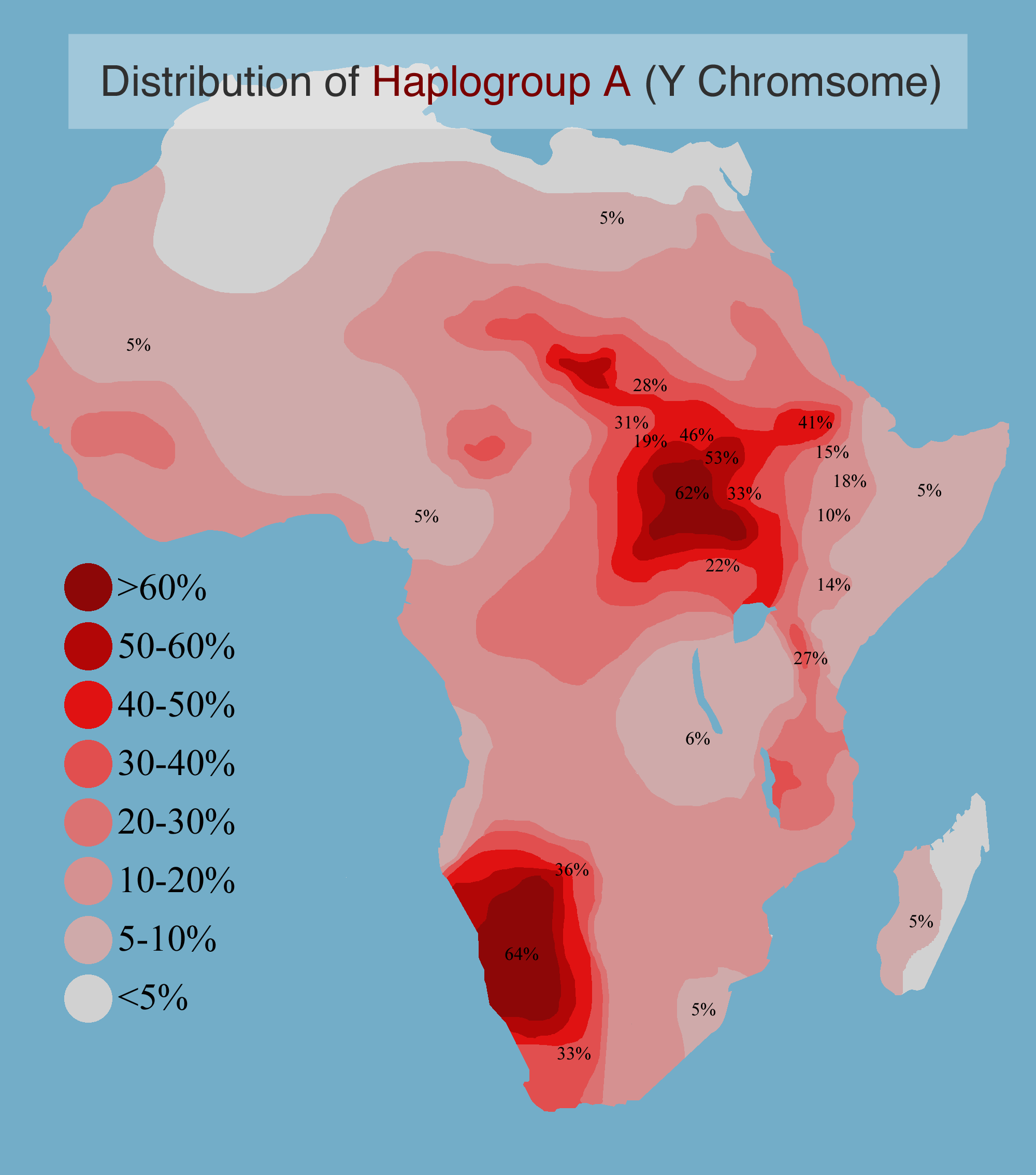
- Possible time of origin: 270,000 BP, 275,000 BP (303,000-241,000 BP), 291,000 BP
- Coalescence age: 275,000 BP (split with other lineages)
- Possible place of origin: Northwest Africa, Central Africa
- Ancestor: Human Y-MRCA (A00-T)
- Descendants: primary: A00 (AF6/L1284), A0-T (Subclades of these include haplogroups A00a, A00b, A00c, A0, A1, A1a, A1b, A1b1 and BT.)

Haplogroup A is a human Y-chromosome DNA haplogroup, which includes all living human Y chromosomes. Bearers of extant sub-clades of haplogroup A are almost exclusively found in Africa (or among the African diaspora), in contrast with haplogroup BT, bearers of which participated in the Out of Africa migration of early modern humans. The known branches of haplogroup A are A00, A0, A1a, and A1b1; these branches are only very distantly related, and are not more closely related to each other than they are to haplogroup BT.

== Origin ==
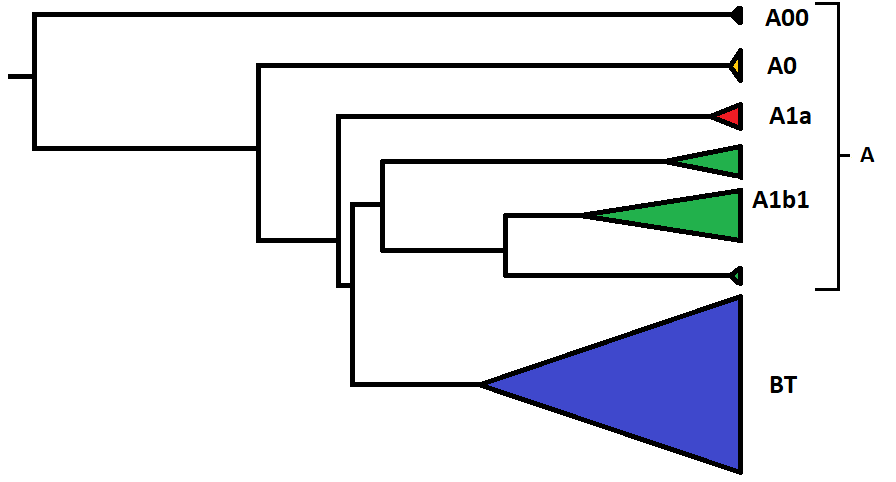
Tree showing relationship between branches of haplogroup A and haplogroup BT

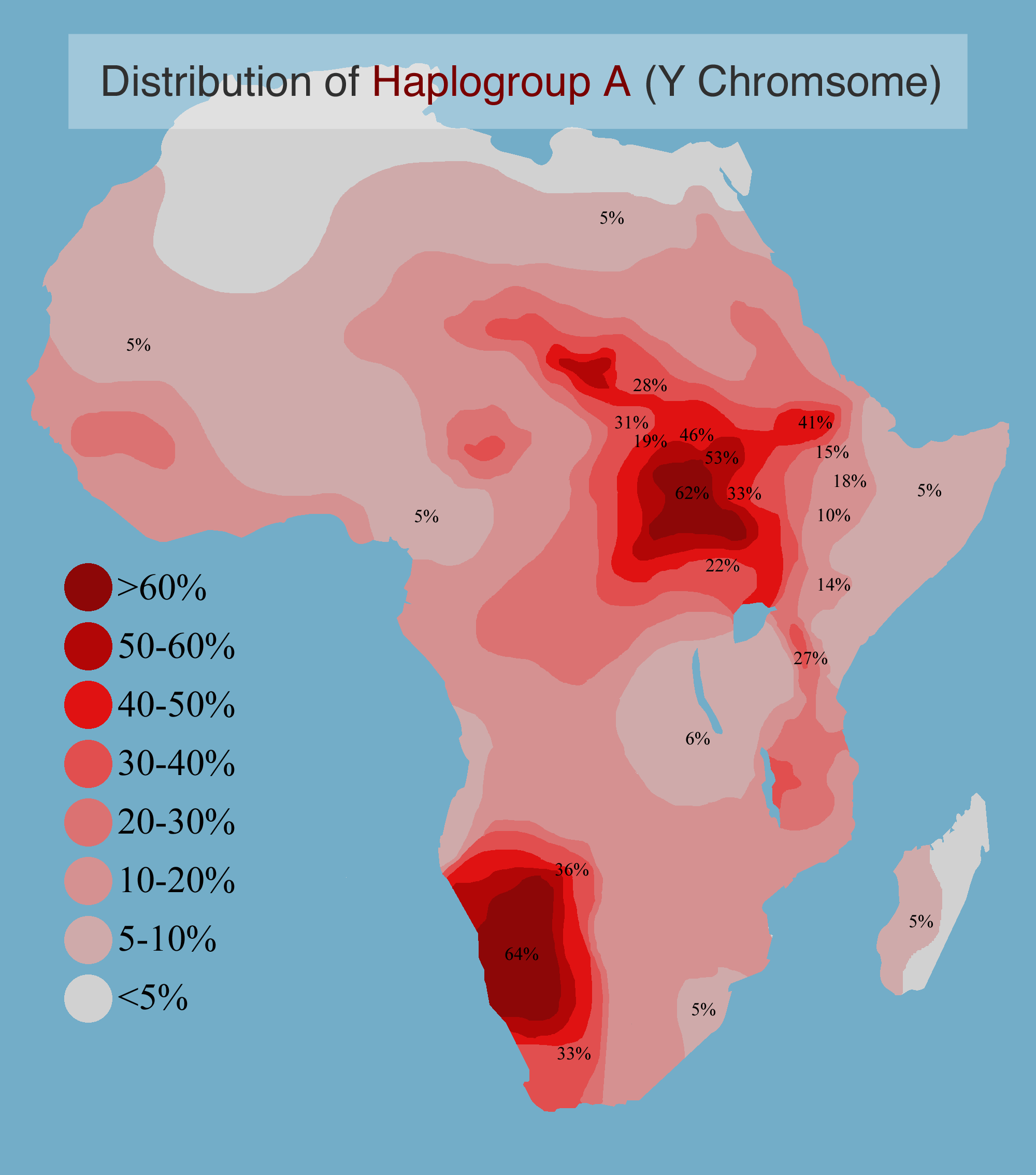
Projected spatial frequency distribution of haplogroup A in Africa.

Though there are terminological challenges to define it as a haplogroup, haplogroup A has come to mean "the foundational haplogroup" (viz. of contemporary human populations); it is not defined by any mutation, but refers to any haplogroup which is not descended from the haplogroup BT; in other words, it is defined by the absence of the defining mutation of that group (M91). By this definition, haplogroup A includes all mutations that took place between the Y-chromosomal most recent common ancestor (estimated at some 270 kya) and the mutation defining haplogroup BT (estimated at some 140–150 kya), including any extant subclades that may yet to be discovered.

Bearers of haplogroup A (i.e. absence of the defining mutation of haplogroup BT) have been found in Southern Africa's hunter-gatherer inhabited areas, especially among the San people. In addition, the most basal mitochondrial DNA L0 lineages are also largely restricted to the San. However, the A lineages of Southern Africa are sub-clades of A lineages found in other parts of Africa, suggesting that A sub-haplogroups arrived in Southern Africa from elsewhere.

The two most basal lineages of haplogroup A, A0 and A1 (prior to the announcement of the discovery of haplogroup A00 in 2013), have been detected in West Africa, Northwest Africa and Central Africa. Cruciani et al. (2011) suggest that these lineages may have emerged somewhere in between Central and Northwest Africa. Scozzari et al. (2012) also supported "the hypothesis of an origin in the north-western quadrant of the African continent for the A1b [ i.e. A0 ] haplogroup".

Haplogroup A1b1b2 has been found among ancient fossils excavated at Balito Bay in KwaZulu-Natal, South Africa, which have been dated to around 2149-1831 BP (2/2; 100%).

== Distribution ==
By definition of haplogroup A as "non-BT", it is almost completely restricted to Africa, though a very small handful of bearers have been reported in Europe and Western Asia.

The clade achieves its highest modern frequencies in the Bushmen hunter-gatherer populations of Southern Africa, followed closely by many Nilotic groups in Eastern Africa. However, haplogroup A's oldest sub-clades are exclusively found in Central-Northwest Africa, where it (and by extension the patrilinear ancestor of modern humans) is believed to have originated. Estimates of its time depth have varied greatly, at either close to 190 kya or close to 140 kya in separate 2013 studies, and with the inclusion of the previously unknown "A00" haplogroup to about 270 kya in 2015 studies.

The clade has also been observed at notable frequencies in certain populations in Ethiopia, as well as some Pygmy groups in Central Africa, and less commonly Niger–Congo speakers, who largely belong to the E1b1a clade. Haplogroup E in general is believed to have originated in Northeast Africa, and was later introduced to West Africa from where it spread around 5,000 years ago to Central, Southern and Southeastern Africa with the Bantu expansion. According to Wood et al. (2005) and Rosa et al. (2007), such relatively recent population movements from West Africa changed the pre-existing population Y chromosomal diversity in Central, Southern and Southeastern Africa, replacing the previous haplogroups in these areas with the now dominant E1b1a lineages. Traces of ancestral inhabitants, however, can be observed today in these regions via the presence of the Y DNA haplogroups A-M91 and B-M60 that are common in certain relict populations, such as the Mbuti people and the Khoisan.

Haplogroup A frequencies in Africa
Study population	Freq. (in %)	Ref.
Tsumkwe San (Namibia)	66	
Nama (Namibia)	64	
Dinka (Sudan)	62	
Shilluk (Sudan)	53	
Nuba (Sudan)	46	
Khoisan	44	
Ethiopian Jews	41	
!Kung/Sekele	~40	
Borgu (Sudan)	35	
Nuer (Sudan)	33	
Fur (Sudan)	31	
Maasai (Kenya)	27	
Nara (Eritrea)	20	
Masalit (Sudan)	19	
Ethiopians	14	
Bantu (Kenya)	14	
Mandara (Cameroon)	14	
Hausa (Sudan)	13	
Khwe (South Africa)	12	
Fulbe (Cameroon)	12	
Dama (Namibia)	11	
Oromo (Ethiopia)	10	
Kunama (Eritrea)	10	
South Semitic (Ethiopia)	10	
Arabs (Egypt)	3	

In a composite sample of 3551 African men, haplogroup A had a frequency of 5.4%. The highest frequencies of haplogroup A have been reported among the Khoisan of Southern Africa, Beta Israel, and Nilo-Saharans from Sudan.

=== Africa ===
==== North Africa ====
In North Africa, haplogroup A is largely absent. Its subclade A1 has been observed at trace frequencies among Moroccans.

===== Upper Nile =====
Haplogroup A3b2 (A-M13) is common among the Southern Sudanese (53%), especially the Dinka Sudanese (61.5%). Haplogroup A2b2 (A-M13) also has been observed in another sample of a South Sudanese population at a frequency of 45% (18/40), including 1/40 A3b2a (A-M171).

Further downstream around the Nile valley, the subclade A3b2 has also been observed at very low frequencies in a sample of Egyptian males (3%).

==== West Africa ====
Eight male individuals from Guinea Bissau, two male individuals from Niger, one male individual from Mali, and one male individual from Cabo Verde carried haplogroup A1a.

==== Central Africa ====
Haplogroup A3b2 (A-M13) has been observed in populations of northern Cameroon (2/9 = 22% Tupuri, 4/28 = 14% Mandara, 2/17 = 12% Fulbe) and eastern DRC (2/9 = 22% Alur, 1/18 = 6% Hema, 1/47 = 2% Mbuti).

Haplogroup A-M91(xA1a-M31, A2-M6/M14/P3/P4, A3-M32) has been observed in the Bakola people of southern Cameroon (3/33 = 9%).

Without testing for any subclade, haplogroup A Y-DNA has been observed in samples of several populations of Gabon, including 9% (3/33) of a sample of Baka, 3% (1/36) of a sample of Ndumu, 2% (1/46) of a sample of Duma, 2% (1/57) of a sample of Nzebi, and 2% (1/60) of a sample of Tsogo.

==== East Africa ====
===== African Great Lakes =====
Bantus in Kenya (14%, Luis et al. 2004) and Iraqw in Tanzania (3/43 = 7.0% (Luis et al. 2004) to 1/6 = 17% (Knight et al. 2003)).

===== Horn of Africa =====
Haplogroup A is found at low to moderate frequencies in the Horn of Africa. The clade is observed at highest frequencies among the 41% of a sample of the Beta Israel, occurring among 41% of one sample from this population (Cruciani et al. 2002). Elsewhere in the region, haplogroup A has been reported in 14.6% (7/48) of an Amhara sample, 10.3% (8/78) of an Oromo sample, and 13.6% (12/88) of another sample from Ethiopia.

==== Southern Africa ====
One 2005 study has found haplogroup A in samples of various Khoisan-speaking tribes with frequency ranging from 10% to 70%. This particular haplogroup was not found in a sample of the Hadzabe from Tanzania, a population sometimes proposed as a remnant of a Late Stone Age Khoisanid population.

=== Asia ===
In Asia, haplogroup A has been observed at low frequencies in Asia Minor and the Middle East among Aegean Turks, Palestinians, Jordanians, Yemenites.

=== Europe ===
A1b1b2b (M13; formerly A3b2), has been observed at very low frequencies in some Mediterranean islands. Without testing for any subclade, haplogroup A has been found in a sample of Greeks from Mitilini on the Aegean island of Lesvos and in samples of Portuguese from southern Portugal, central Portugal, and Madeira. The authors of one study have reported finding what appears to be haplogroup A in 3.1% (2/65) of a sample of Cypriots, though they have not definitively excluded the possibility that either of these individuals may belong to a rare subclade of haplogroup BT, including haplogroup CT.

== Subclades ==
=== A00 (A00-AF6) ===
A00 is also sometimes known as "Perry's Y-chromosome" (or simply "Perry's Y"). This previously unknown haplogroup was discovered in 2012 in the Y chromosome of an African-American man who had submitted his DNA to FamilyTreeDNA. He was identified as a descendent of Albert Perry, hence the name. (Note: Albert Perry, a slave born in the United States between ca. 1819–1827, lived in York County, South Carolina. See FamilyTreeDNA, Haplogroup A chart) Mendez et al. (2013) announced the discovery of this previously unknown haplogroup, for which they proposed the designator "A00". Perry's Y would later be renamed A00a after the discovery of a similar but different group from Cameroon.

A00 has an estimated age of around 275 kya, so is roughly contemporary with the known appearance of earliest known anatomically modern humans, such as Jebel Irhoud. (Note: At first, via Mendez et al. (2013), this was announced as "extremely ancient" (95% confidence interval 237–581 kya for the age of the Y-MRCA including the lineage of this postulated haplogroup).)

Researchers later found A00 was possessed by 11 Mbo males of Western Cameroon (Bantu) (out of a sample of 174; 6.32%). Subsequent research suggested that the overall rate of A00 was even higher among the Mbo, i.e. 9.3% (8 of 86). The Mbo samples were later classified as its own subgroup, A00b (A-A4987).

Further research in 2015 indicates that the modern population with the highest concentration of A00 is the Bangwa (or Nweh), a Yemba-speaking group of Cameroon (Grassfields Bantu): 27 of 67 (40.3%) samples were positive for A00a (L1149). One Bangwa individual did not fit into either A00a or A00b.

Yet another A00 subtype is designated A00c. The modern sample from Cameroon reported to carry it, "YSEQ5368" is not linked to any paper.

Geneticists sequenced genome-wide DNA data from four people buried at the site of Shum Laka in Cameroon between 8000–3000 years ago, who were most genetically similar to Mbuti pygmies. One individual carried A00. ("At every subtype-specific site for which we had coverage, the Shum Laka A00 carries the ancestral allele.") Data for this individual from Shum Laka is now found in the Allen Ancient Genome Diversity Project / John Templeton Ancient DNA Atlas under the code "I10871". He seems to represent an earlier stage of A00 before the divergence into the three groups. The last common ancestor of A00a, A00b, and A00c (A00-Y125399) is 633 SNPs removed from him.

=== A0 (A-V148) ===
The haplogroup names "A-V148" and "A-CTS2809/L991" refer to the exact same haplogroup.

A0 is found only in Bakola Pygmies (South Cameroon) at 8.3% and Berbers from Algeria at 1.5%. Also found in Ghana.

=== A1a (A-M31) ===
The subclade A1a (M31) has been found in approximately 2.8% (8/282) of a pool of seven samples of various ethnic groups in Guinea-Bissau, especially among the Papel-Manjaco-Mancanha (5/64 = 7.8%). In an earlier study published in 2003, Gonçalves et al. have reported finding A1a-M31 in 5.1% (14/276) of a sample from Guinea-Bissau and in 0.5% (1/201) of a pair of samples from Cabo Verde. The authors of another study have reported finding haplogroup A1a (M31) in 5% (2/39) of a sample of Mandinka from Senegambia and 2% (1/55) of a sample of Dogon from Mali. Haplogroup A1a (M31) also has been found in 3% (2/64) of a sample of Berbers from Morocco and 2.3% (1/44) of a sample of unspecified ethnic affiliation from Mali.

In 2007, seven men from Yorkshire, England sharing the unusual surname Revis were identified as being from the A1a (M31) subclade. It was discovered that these men had a common male-line ancestor from the 18th century, but no previous information about African ancestry was known.

=== A1b1a1a (A-M6) ===
The subclade A1b1a1a (M6; formerly A2 and A1b1a1a-M6) is typically found among Khoisan peoples. The authors of one study have reported finding haplogroup A-M6(xA-P28) in 28% (8/29) of a sample of Tsumkwe San and 16% (5/32) of a sample of !Kung/Sekele, and haplogroup A2b-P28 in 17% (5/29) of a sample of Tsumkwe San, 9% (3/32) of a sample of !Kung/Sekele, 9% (1/11) of a sample of Nama, and 6% (1/18) of a sample of Dama. The authors of another study have reported finding haplogroup A2 in 15.4% (6/39) of a sample of Khoisan males, including 5/39 A2-M6/M14/M23/M29/M49/M71/M135/M141(xA2a-M114) and 1/39 A2a-M114.

=== A1b1b (A-M32) ===
The clade A1b1b (M32; formerly A3) contains the most populous branches of haplogroup A and is mainly found in Eastern Africa and Southern Africa.

=== A1b1b1 (A-M28) ===
The subclade (appropriately considered as a distinct haplogroup) A1b1b1 (M28; formerly A3a) has only been rarely observed in the Horn of Africa. In 5% (1/20) of a mixed sample of speakers of South Semitic languages from Ethiopia, 1.1% (1/88) of a sample of Ethiopians, and 0.5% (1/201) in Somalis. it has also been observed in Eastern, Central and Southern of Arabia. Current results, according to FTDNA, suggest that some branches such as A-V1127 originated in Arabia. Additionally, as suggested by experts as seen in TMRCA in Yfull tree, this haplogroup must have undergone a bottleneck time when people who represent this haplogroup suffered some sort of extinction and sharply decreased in number. Noteworthy, non semitic speakers don't have this haplogroup neither the koi-san or the nilots or the Cushites.

=== A1b1b2a (A-M51) ===
The subclade A1b1b2a (M51; formerly A3b1) occurs most frequently among Khoisan peoples (6/11 = 55% Nama, 11/39 = 28% Khoisan, 7/32 = 22% !Kung/Sekele, 6/29 = 21% Tsumkwe San, 1/18 = 6% Dama). However, it also has been found with lower frequency among Bantu peoples of Southern Africa, including 2/28 = 7% Sotho–Tswana, 3/53 = 6% non-Khoisan Southern Africans, 4/80 = 5% Xhosa, and 1/29 = 3% Zulu.

=== A1b1b2b (A-M13) ===
The subclade A1b1b2b (M13; formerly A3b2) is primarily distributed among Nilotic populations in East Africa and northern Cameroon. It is different from the A subclades that are found in the Khoisan samples and only remotely related to them (it is actually only one of many subclades within haplogroup A). This finding suggests an ancient divergence.

In Sudan, haplogroup A-M13 has been found in 28/53 = 52.8% of Southern Sudanese, 13/28 = 46.4% of the Nuba of central Sudan, 25/90 = 27.8% of Western Sudanese, 4/32 = 12.5% of local Hausa people, and 5/216 = 2.3% of Northern Sudanese.

In Ethiopia, one study has reported finding haplogroup A-M13 in 14.6% (7/48) of a sample of Amhara and 10.3% (8/78) of a sample of Oromo. Another study has reported finding haplogroup A3b2b-M118 in 6.8% (6/88) and haplogroup A3b2*-M13(xA3b2a-M171, A3b2b-M118) in 5.7% (5/88) of a mixed sample of Ethiopians, amounting to a total of 12.5% (11/88) A3b2-M13.

Haplogroup A-M13 also has been observed occasionally outside of Central and Eastern Africa, as in the Aegean Region of Turkey (2/30 = 6.7%), Yemenite Jews (1/20 = 5%), Egypt (4/147 = 2.7%, 3/92 = 3.3%), Palestinian Arabs (2/143 = 1.4%), Sardinia (1/77 = 1.3%, 1/22 = 4.5%), the capital of Jordan, Amman (1/101=1%), and Oman (1/121 = 0.8%).

Haplogroup A-M13 has been found among three Neolithic period fossils excavated from the Kadruka site in Sudan.

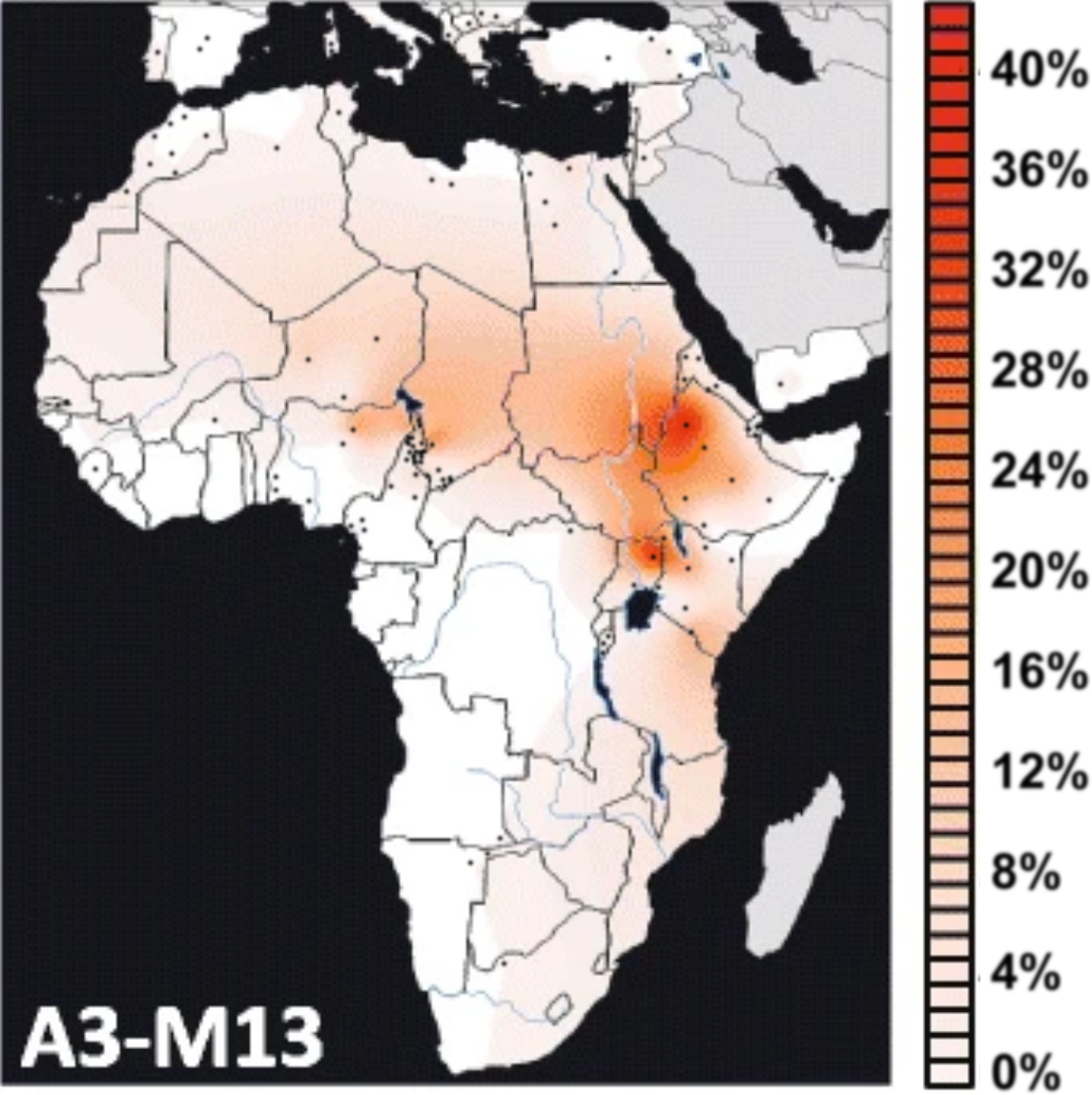
Geographical frequency distribution of Haplogroup A3-M13.

Haplogroup A-M13 was also found in a male victim of the Mt. Vesuvius eruption in Pompeii.

== Phylogenetics ==
=== Phylogenetic history ===
Prior to 2002, there were in academic literature at least seven naming systems for the Y-Chromosome Phylogenetic tree. This led to considerable confusion. In 2002, the major research groups came together and formed the Y-Chromosome Consortium (YCC). They published a joint paper that created a single new tree that all agreed to use. Later, a group of citizen scientists with an interest in population genetics and genetic genealogy formed a working group to create an amateur tree aiming at being above all timely. The table below brings together all of these works at the point of the landmark 2002 YCC Tree. This allows a researcher reviewing older published literature to quickly move between nomenclatures.

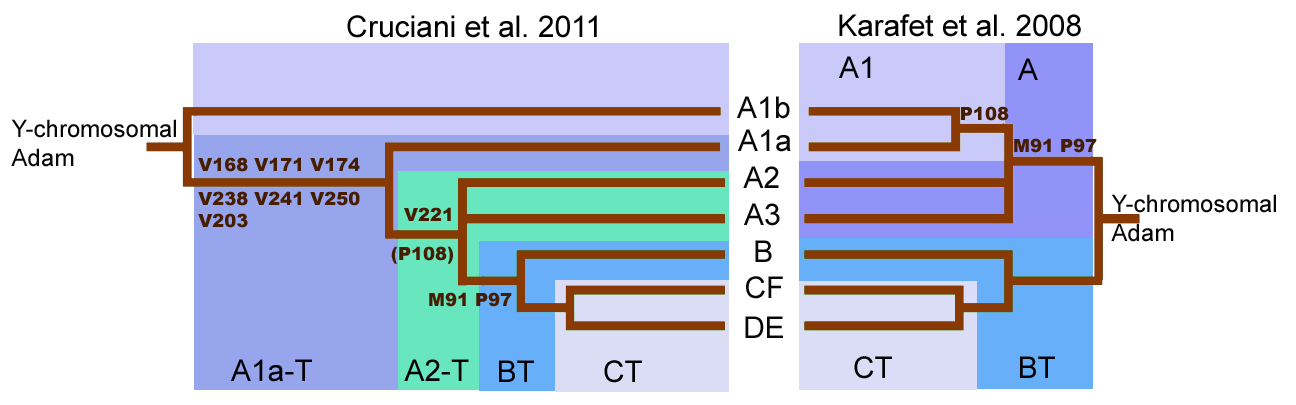
The revised y-chromosome family tree by Cruciani et al. 2011 compared with the family tree from Karafet et al. 2008. (The "A1a-T" shown here is now known as A1 and "A2-T" is now known as A1b.)

Initial sequencing of the human Y-chromosome had suggested that first split in the Y-Chromosome family tree occurred with the mutations that separated Haplogroup BT from Y-chromosomal Adam and haplogroup A more broadly. Subsequently, many intervening splits between Y-chromosomal Adam and BT, also became known.

A major shift in the understanding of the Y-DNA tree came with the publication of (Cruciani 2011). While the SNP marker M91 had been regarded as a key to identifying haplogroup BT, it was realised that the region surrounding M91 was a mutational hotspot, which is prone to recurrent back-mutations. Moreover, the 8T stretch of Haplogroup A represented the ancestral state of M91, and the 9T of haplogroup BT a derived state, which arose following the insertion of 1T. This explained why subclades A1b and A1a, the deepest branches of Haplogroup A, both possessed the 8T stretch. Similarly, the P97 marker, which was also used to identify haplogroup A, possessed the ancestral state in haplogroup A, but a derived state in haplogroup BT. Ultimately the tendency of M91 to back-mutate and (hence) its unreliability, led to M91 being discarded as a defining SNP by ISOGG in 2016. Conversely, P97 has been retained as a defining marker of Haplogroup BT.

YCC 2002/2008 (Shorthand)	(α)	(β)	(γ)	(δ)	(ε)	(ζ)	(η)	YCC 2002 (Longhand)	YCC 2005 (Longhand)	YCC 2008 (Longhand)	YCC 2010r (Longhand)	ISOGG 2006	ISOGG 2007	ISOGG 2008	ISOGG 2009	ISOGG 2010	ISOGG 2011	ISOGG 2012
A-M31	7	I	1A	1	–	H1	A	A1	A1	A1	A1a	A1	A1	A1a	A1a	A1a	A1a	A1a
A-M6	27	I	2	3	–	H1	A	A2*	A2	A2	A2	A2	A2	A2	A2	A2	A2	A1b1a1a
A-M114	27	I	2	3	–	H1	A	A2a	A2a	A2a	A2a	A2a	A2a	A2a	A2a	A2a	A2a	A1b1a1a1a
A-P28	27	I	2	4	–	H1	A	A2b	A2b	A2b	A2b	A2b	A2b	A2b	A2b	A2b	A2b	A1b1a1a1b
A-M32	*	*	*	*	*	*	*	*	A3	A3	A3	A3	A3	A3	A3	A3	A3	A1b1b
A-M28	7	I	1A	1	–	H1	A	A3a	A3a	A3a	A3a	A3a	A3a	A3a	A3a	A3a	A3a	A1b1b1
A-M51	7	I	1A	1	–	H1	A	A3b1	A3b1	A3b1	A3b1	A3b1	A3b1	A3b1	A3b1	A3b1	A3b1	A1b1b2a
A-M13	7	I	1A	2	Eu1	H1	A	A3b2*	A3b2	A3b2	A3b2	A3b2	A3b2	A3b2	A3b2	A3b2	A3b2	A1b1b2b
A-M171	7	I	1A	2	Eu1	H1	A	A3b2a	A3b2a	A3b2a	A3b2a	A3b2a	A3b2a	A3b2a	A3b2a	A3b2a	A3b2a	removed
A-M118	7	I	1A	2	Eu1	H1	A	A3b2b	A3b2b	A3b2b	A3b2b	A3b2b	A3b2b	A3b2b	A3b2b	A3b2b	A3b2b	A1b1b2b1

The following research teams per their publications were represented in the creation of the YCC Tree.

- α Jobling and Tyler-Smith 2000 and Kaladjieva 2001
- β Underhill 2000
- γ Hammer 2001
- δ Karafet 2001
- ε Semino 2000
- ζ Su 1999
- η Capelli 2001

=== Phylogenetic trees ===
The above phylogenetic tree is based on the ISOGG, YCC, and subsequent published research.

Y-chromosomal Adam
A00 (AF6/L1284)

- A00a (L1149, FGC25576, FGC26292, FGC26293, FGC27741)
- A00b (A4987/YP3666, A4981, A4982/YP2683, A4984/YP2995, A4985/YP3292, A4986, A4988/YP3731)
- A00c (A12222, A12220, A12221)

A0-T (L1085)

- A0 (CTS2809/L991) formerly A1b
- A1 (P305) formerly A1a-T, A0 and A1b
  - A1a (M31)
  - A1b (P108) formerly A2-T
    - A1b1 (L419/PF712)
      - A1b1a (L602, V50, V82, V198, V224)
        - A1b1a1 (M14) formerly A2
          - A1b1a1a (M6)
            - A1b1a1a1 (P28) formerly A1b1a1a1b and A2b
      - A1b1b (M32) formerly A3
        - A1b1b1 (M28) formerly A3a
        - A1b1b2 (L427)
          - A1b1b2a (M51/Page42) formerly A3b1
            - A1b1b2a1 (P291)
          - A1b1b2b (M13/PF1374) formerly A3b2
            - A1b1b2b1 (M118)
    - BT (M91)

== See also ==
- Human Y-chromosome DNA haplogroup
- Y-DNA haplogroups in populations of Sub-Saharan Africa
- Y-DNA haplogroups by ethnic group

Y-DNA A subclades

- A-M114
- A-M118
- A-M13
- A-M171
- A-M28
- A-M31
- A-M32
- A-M51
- A-M6
- A-P28
