= Haplogroup A-P305 =

Human Y-chromosome DNA haplogroup

Haplogroup A1
- Possible time of origin: 161,300 years BP
- Possible place of origin: Africa
- Ancestor: A0-T
- Descendants: A1a and A1b
- Defining mutations: P305

Haplogroup A-P305 (or A1) is a human Y-chromosome DNA haplogroup representing one of the earliest paternal lineages in the modern human Y-chromosome phylogeny. It emerged in Africa approximately 161,300 years ago.

== Discovery and Nomenclature ==
Haplogroup A1 was originally identified through the analysis of the P305 single nucleotide polymorphism (SNP), which defines this lineage. It is part of the broader haplogroup A0-T (also called A-L1085), one of the two primary branches that split from the root of the human Y-chromosome tree. The recognition of A1 as a major lineage was pivotal in refining our understanding of human paternal ancestry.

The haplogroup was initially known under various names depending on the nomenclature system used, but A-P305 is now widely accepted in the Y-DNA research community.

== Genetic Markers and Mutations ==
The defining mutation for haplogroup A1 is the P305 SNP, a point mutation on the Y chromosome. This mutation is considered basal and is present in all known descendants of A1. Downstream mutations further define its subclades:

- A1a (M31, P82)
- A1b (P108, V221, among others)

The identification of these markers allows geneticists to classify Y-DNA samples accurately and infer lineage splits and timelines.

== Phylogenetic Position ==
Haplogroup A1 branches from haplogroup A0-T and is one of the earliest splits within the human Y-chromosome phylogeny. It is a sibling clade to A0, with both representing the earliest divergences from the most recent common ancestor (Y-chromosomal Adam). The remaining lineages, including most non-African Y-DNA haplogroups, fall under haplogroup BT, which derives from A0-T.

== Geographical Distribution and Population Studies ==
A1 is predominantly found in African populations, with basal A-P305* lineages mainly concentrated in Central and Northwest Africa. Notably high frequencies are observed among:

- Bakola Pygmies of Cameroon (~8.3%)
- Berbers in Tunisia (~1.5%)
- Some Ghanaian groups
- Khoisan hunter-gatherers of Southern Africa
- Nilotic populations in Eastern Africa
- Certain Pygmy groups in Central Africa

Outside Africa, A1 is extremely rare but detected sporadically in European and Western Asian populations, likely reflecting ancient gene flow or recent admixture.

== Evolutionary Significance ==
The basal position of haplogroup A1 makes it vital for understanding early modern human evolution and the peopling of Africa. The diversity and distribution of its subclades indicate a deep-rooted presence in Africa, supporting the hypothesis that modern humans originated on this continent around 140,000 to 160,000 years ago.

Haplogroup A1’s existence alongside the A0 lineage, and their divergence from the common ancestor Y-chromosomal Adam, provides insight into early population structure and the timing of demographic expansions within Africa.

== Cultural and Anthropological Context ==
The populations carrying A1 lineages often belong to traditional hunter-gatherer or pastoralist communities, such as the Pygmies and Khoisan, groups that have preserved some of the oldest genetic lineages in humans. The study of these haplogroups in such groups has helped anthropologists reconstruct migration patterns and social structures in prehistoric Africa.

== Technical Considerations in Testing ==
The detection of haplogroup A1 requires Y-chromosome sequencing or SNP genotyping focused on the P305 mutation and downstream markers. Advances in high-throughput sequencing have refined the phylogenetic tree, revealing additional sub-branches within A1 and improving age estimates.

Many commercial genetic testing companies currently do not fully differentiate basal A1 lineages, making academic and specialized research crucial for detailed understanding.

== Comparisons With Other Haplogroups ==
Unlike haplogroups common outside Africa, such as R, J, or E, which belong to haplogroup BT, A1 remains almost entirely restricted to Africa. This contrast illustrates a deep divergence within the human paternal lineage and underscores the complex demographic history of our species.

== Migration and Population Dynamics ==
The distribution of A1 and its subclades suggests complex prehistoric migrations within Africa, including expansions related to climate changes and technological innovations. The relative absence of A1 outside Africa supports the idea of limited paternal gene flow during the initial out-of-Africa migrations approximately 60,000 to 70,000 years ago.
