= Haplogroup BT =

Human Y chromosome DNA grouping indicating common ancestry

- Possible time of origin: ~150,000-145,000 BP
- Possible place of origin: Africa
- Ancestor: A2-T
- Descendants: B-M60, CT
- Defining mutations: Page65.1/SRY1532.1/SRY10831.1, M42, M91, M94, M139, M299, P97, V21, V29, V31, V59, V64, V102, V187, V202, V216, V235

Haplogroup BT M91, also known as Haplogroup A1b2 (and formerly as A4, BR and BCDEF), is a Y-chromosome haplogroup. BT is a subclade of haplogroup A1b (P108) and a sibling of the haplogroup A1b1 (L419/PF712).

== Ancient DNA ==
Later Stone Age individuals excavated at Fingira Rock, Malawi, dated to around 6100 years ago (2/2 males), and at Mount Hora, Malawi, dated to around 8000 years ago (1/1 males), all belonged to Y haplogroup BT(xCT). (Note: In other words, the haplogroups did not belong to haplogroup CT, but may have belonged to haplogroup B.)

== Distribution ==
Basal BT* has not been documented in any living individuals or ancient remains. No definite examples of BT(xCF,DE) – i.e. members of BT outside the only two known branches of BT, namely haplogroups B and CT – have been identified. In some cases, because testing is undertaken only for geographically and historically likely haplogroups, the data required to identify a precise subclade has not been collected and/or recorded. For instance, research published in 2013, regarding a sample of more than 2,000 men from different parts of Africa, included 7.5% belonging to haplogroup BT(xDE,K). These approximately 150 individuals may have included, for example: B*, unknown primary branches of haplogroups B, BT, CT or CF; haplogroup C, and/or; F(xK) (i.e. haplogroup F* plus its subclades G, H and IJ, but specifically excluding the broader haplogroup K and its subclades, such as haplogroups K*, LT, K2b*, MS, NO, P, Q and R).

== Phylogenetics ==
The ISOGG tree since 2014 has treated M91 as the defining mutation of BT.

- B M60, M181, P85, P90
- CT P9.1, M168, M294

Prior to 2002, there were in academic literature at least seven naming systems for the Y-Chromosome Phylogenetic tree. This led to considerable confusion. In 2002, the major research groups came together and formed the Y-Chromosome Consortium (YCC). They published a joint paper that created a single new tree that all agreed to use.

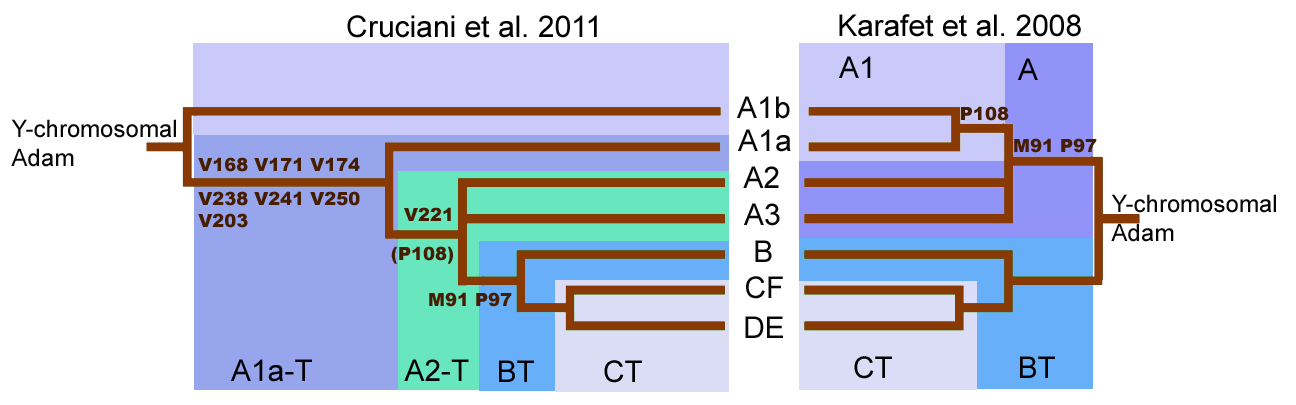
The revised y-chromosome family tree by Cruciani et al. (2011) compared with the family tree from Karafet et al. (2008). Cruciani et al. (2011) define BT via M91 and P97, and as a consequence, ISOGG has listed BT since February 2012, and treated M91 as defining mutation for BT since 2014.

== See also ==
- Conversion table for Y chromosome haplogroups
- Genetic genealogy
- Haplogroup D (Y-DNA)
- Haplogroup DE (Y-DNA)
- Haplogroup
- Haplotype
- Human Y-chromosome DNA haplogroup
- Molecular phylogenetics
- Paragroup
- Subclade
- Y-chromosome haplogroups in populations of the world
- Y-DNA haplogroups by ethnic group
- Y-DNA haplogroups in populations of Sub-Saharan Africa
