= Duma people =

Riverine ethnic group of Gabon

The Adouma (or Duma) are an ethnic group of Gabon, in central Africa. They primarily live on the South bank of the upper Ogooué River, in the vicinity of Lastoursville (originally an Adouma village), and are known as expert canoeists or the boatmen. They speak Duma, a Nzebi language of the Bantu family.

Their traditions hold that they arrived from the East or Southeast, coming down the Sebe River to the Ogowe, and thence to the Doumé rapids. They made canoes of Aucoumea wood, and sold slaves to the Okandé, receiving European products such as guns and cloth in exchange. The Société du Haut-Ogooué (SHO) established a post at Lastoursville and engaged the Adouma in trade for rubber, ivory, and ebony.

During the 1970s and 1980s, many Adouma moved down the Ogowe, towards Port-Gentil.
