= Haplogroup B-M60 =

Human Y chromosome DNA grouping indicating common ancestry

Haplogroup B
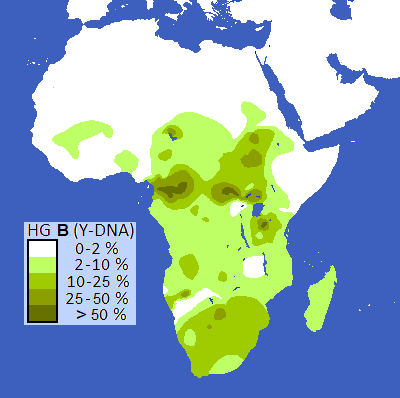
- Possible time of origin: 100,000 years BP
- Possible place of origin: Africa, region unknown
- Ancestor: BT
- Descendants: Primary: B1 (M236), B2 (M182), B3 (L1387); Subclades of the above include: B1a (M146); B2b (M112); B2a1a1a1 (M109)
- Defining mutations: M60, M181/Page32, P85, P90, V62, V75, V78, V83, V84, V85, V90, V93, V94, V185, V197, V217, V227, V234, V237, and V44
- Highest frequencies: Baka 63% (Gabon & Cameroon) - 72% (CAR), Hadzabe (Tanzania) 52%-60%, Nuer (South Sudan) 50%, Mbuti (DRC) 33%-60%, Biaka (CAR) 35%-55%, Central Africa 32%, Tsumkwe San (Namibia) 31%, Khoisan 28%, Shilluk (South Sudan) 27%, Burunge (Tanzania) 25%, Dinka (South Sudan) 23%, Ngumba (Cameroon) 23%-33%, Eviya (Gabon) 21%, Fali (Cameroon) 18%, Sotho–Tswana (South Africa) 18%, Zulu (South Africa) 17%, Eshira (Gabon) 17%, Shake (Gabon) 16%, Hausa (Sudan) 16%, Sukuma (Tanzania) 16%, Bakola (Cameroon) 15%-36%, Copts (Sudan) 15%, Sudan 15%, Kunama (Eritrea) 15%, Tutsi (Rwanda) 15%, Sandawe (Tanzania) 15%, Uldeme (Cameroon) 5%-31%, Nuba (Sudan) 14%, Makina (Gabon) 14%, Southern Africa 13%, Mali 11%, Ewondo (Cameroon) 10%, Ethiopia 10%, Shona (Zimbabwe) 10% Qeshmi (Iran) 8.2%, Bandari (Iran) 2.3%, Hazara (Afghanistan) 5.1%,

Haplogroup B (M60) is a human Y-chromosome DNA haplogroup common to paternal lineages in The Arabian Peninsula. It is a primary branch of the haplogroup BT.

B (M60) is common in parts of Africa, especially the tropical forests of West-Central Africa. It was the ancestral haplogroup of not only modern Pygmies like the Baka and Mbuti, but also Hadzabe from Tanzania, who often have been considered, in large part because of some typological features of their language, to be a remnant of Khoisan people in East Africa.

== Distribution ==
According to one study of the Y-DNA of populations in Sudan, haplogroup B-M60 is found in approximately 30% (16/53) of Southern Sudanese, 16% (5/32) of local Hausa people, 14% (4/28) of the Nuba of central Sudan, 3.7% (8/216) of Northern Sudanese (but only among Copts and Nubians), and 2.2% (2/90) of Western Sudanese. According to another study, haplogroup B is found in approximately 15% of Sudanese males, including 12.5% (5/40) B2a1a1a1 (M109/M152) and 2.5% (1/40) B-M60(xM146, M150, M112).

In Madagascar, haplogroup B-M60 has been found in approximately 9% of Malagasy males, including 6% (2/35) B-M60(xB2b-50f2(P)) and 3% (1/35) B2b-50f2(P).

Family Tree DNA shows a significant number of persons of Haplogroup B-M60 (B-M181) claiming origins from the Arabian Peninsula (dominantly Saudi Arabia, but also in Kuwait, Bahrain, Yemen, Qatar, Iraq, United Arab Emirates, and Oman). Sampling bias does not allow for meaningful percentages, but the presence of the haplogroup is solidly attested.

In Hormozgan Province in Iran, haplogroup B-M60 has been found in 8.2% of a sample of 49 Qeshmi people, and in 2.3% of a sample of 131 Bandari people.

In Afghanistan, haplogroup B-M60 has been found in 5.1% (3/59) of a sample of Hazara males.

In United Kingdom, haplogroup B-M60(xM218) has been found by FTDNA in 1 individual.

== Subclades ==
=== B-M236 ===
Haplogroup B-M236 has been found in 4% (2/48) of a sample of Bamileke males from southern Cameroon.

==== B-M146 ====
Haplogroup B-M146 has been found in 2% (1/49) of a sample of Mossi males from Burkina Faso and in 2% (1/44) of a sample of unspecified ethnic affiliation from Mali.

=== B-M182 ===
Haplogroup B-M182 has been found in 6% (3/47) of a sample of Mbuti males from the Democratic Republic of the Congo, 6% (2/33) of a sample of Bakola males from southern Cameroon, 6% (1/18) of a sample of Dama males from Namibia, and 3% (1/31) of a sample of Biaka males from Central African Republic. The vast majority of Family Tree DNA participants in Haplogroup B-M60 test positive for B-M182, with three-fourths of those participants claiming countries of the Arabian Peninsula as their ancestral land of origin, attesting to its presence in that area also.

==== B-M150 ====
Haplogroup B-M150 has been found in 8% (1/12) of a sample of Mbuti males from the Democratic Republic of the Congo.

Haplogroup B-M150(xM152) has been observed in 11% (5/47) of a sample of Mbuti from Democratic Republic of the Congo, 11% (1/9) of a sample of Tupuri from northern Cameroon, 11% (1/9) of a sample of Luo from Kenya, 7% (4/55) of a sample of Dogon from Mali, 6% (1/18) of a sample of Baka from Central African Republic, and 2% (1/42) of a sample of Kikuyu and Kamba from Kenya.

Haplogroup B-M150(xM109/M152, M108.1) has been found in 3% (1/37) of a sample from Central Africa, 2% (1/44) of a sample from Mali, and 1% (1/88) of a sample from Ethiopia.

Without testing for any downstream mutation, haplogroup B-M150 has been found in 33.3% (8/24) of a sample of Ngumba from Cameroon, 20.8% (5/24) of a sample of Eviya from Gabon, 18.2% (4/22) of a sample of Bakola from Cameroon, 14.3% (6/42) of a sample of Eshira from Gabon, 14.0% (6/43) of a sample of Makina from Gabon, 14.0% (6/43) of a sample of Shake from Gabon, 8.6% (5/58) of a sample of Punu from Gabon, 8.3% (5/60) of a sample of Tsogo from Gabon, 7.0% (4/57) of a sample of Nzebi from Gabon, 6.7% (1/15) of a sample of Mbugwe from Tanzania, 4.3% (2/46) of a sample of Duma from Gabon, 4.3% (2/47) of a sample of Obamba from Gabon, 4.2% (2/48) of a sample of Benga from Gabon, 3.8% (2/53) of a sample of Kota from Gabon, 2.8% (1/36) of a sample of Ndumu from Gabon, 2.1% (1/47) of a sample of Galoa from Gabon, 2.0% (1/50) of a sample of Akele from Gabon, 1.7% (1/60) of a sample of Fang from Gabon, 1.5% (1/68) of a sample of Sandawe from Tanzania, 1.4% (1/72) of a sample from Qatar, and 0.64% (1/157) of a sample from Saudi Arabia.

===== B-M218 =====
Haplogroup B-M218 has been found in 17% (20/118) of a mixed sample of Nilotic ethnic groups of Karamojong, Jie and Dodos from Karamoja region in Uganda. This haplogroup has also been found by FTDNA in 1 individual from Qatar, 3 individuals from Saudi Arabia, 1 individual from Syria, 1 individual from Tunisia, 1 individual from United Kingdom.

====== B-M109 ======
Haplogroup B2a1a1a1 (M109, M152, P32), previously B2a1a is the most commonly observed subclade of haplogroup B.

In Central Africa, B-M109 Y-DNA has been found in 23% (7/31) of Ngumba males from southern Cameroon, 18% (7/39) of Fali males from northern Cameroon, 5% (1/21) to 31% (4/13) of Uldeme males from northern Cameroon, 10% (3/29) of Ewondo males from southern Cameroon, 7% (1/15) of a mixed sample of speakers of various Chadic languages from northern Cameroon, 6% (1/18) of a mixed sample of speakers of various Adamawa languages from northern Cameroon, 6% (2/33) of Bakola males from southern Cameroon, 4% (1/28) of Mandara males from northern Cameroon, and 3% (1/31) to 5% (1/20) of Biaka males from Central African Republic.

In East Africa, haplogroup B2a1a1a1 Y-DNA has been found in 11% (1/9) of a small sample of Iraqw males from Tanzania, 11% (1/9) of a small sample of Luo males from Kenya, 8% (2/26) of Maasai males from Kenya, and 4.5% (4/88) of a sample of Ethiopians.

In Southern Africa, B-M109 Y-DNA has been found in 18% (5/28) of Sotho–Tswana males from South Africa, 14% (4/29) of Zulu males from South Africa, 13% (7/53) of an ethnically mixed sample of non-Khoisan Southern Africans, 10% (5/49) of Shona males from Zimbabwe, and 5% (4/80) of Xhosa males from South Africa.

In North Africa, haplogroup B2a1a1a1 Y-DNA has been found in 12.5% (5/40) of Sudanese and 2% (2/92) of Egyptians.

In Eurasia, B2a1a1a1 (B-M109) has been found in 3% (3/117) of a sample of Iranians from southern Iran and 2% (2/88) of a sample from Pakistan and India.

====== B-G1 ======
Haplogroup B-G1 (G1) has been found in Uganda in Nilotic speaking populations.

===== B-M108.1 =====
Haplogroup B-M108.1 (M108.1) has been found in 3% (3/88) of a sample from Ethiopia.

====== B-M43 ======
Haplogroup B-M43 (M43, P111) has been found in 7% (3/44) of a sample from Mali.

==== B-M112 ====
Haplogroup B-M112 (M112, M192, 50f2(P)) has been found mainly among pygmy populations in Central Africa, Juu (Northern Khoisan) populations in Southern Africa, and the Hadzabe in East Africa. It also has been found occasionally in samples of groups who neighbor the aforementioned populations.

Specifically, haplogroup B2b has been observed in 67% (12/18) of a sample of Baka from Central African Republic, 52% (12/23) or 51% (29/57) of a sample of Hadzabe from Tanzania, 48% (15/31) of a sample of Biaka from Central African Republic, 43% (20/47) of a sample of Mbuti from the Democratic Republic of the Congo, 31% (9/29) of a sample of Tsumkwe San from Namibia, 28% (11/39) of a sample of the Northern Khoisan-speaking Ju|’hoansi and Sekele peoples, 25% (6/24) of a sample of Burunge from Tanzania, 14% (13/94) of a sample of Tutsi from Rwanda, 13% (9/68) of a sample of Sandawe from Tanzania, 9% (3/32) of a sample of !Kung/Sekele from Namibia, 5% (1/20) of a sample of Turu from Tanzania, 5% (2/43) of a sample of Wairak from Tanzania, 3% (1/29) of a sample of Zulu from South Africa, 3% (1/33) of a sample of Bakola from southern Cameroon, 3% (1/35) of a sample of Datog from Tanzania, 3% (1/35) of a sample of Malagasy, 1.4% (1/69) of a sample of Hutu from Rwanda, 1.4% (1/72) of a sample from Qatar, and 1.3% (2/157) of a sample from Saudi Arabia.

===== B-P6 =====
Haplogroup B-P6 has been found in Khoisan populations of Namibia, including 24% (7/29) of a sample of Tsumkwe San and 3% (1/32) of a sample of !Kung/Sekele.

===== B-M115 =====
Haplogroup B-M115 has been found in 8% (1/12) of a sample of Mbuti from the Democratic Republic of the Congo.

===== B-M30 =====
Haplogroup B-M30 has been found in 22% (2/9) of a mixed sample of speakers of Central Sudanic and Saharan languages from northern Cameroon and in 5% (1/20) of a sample of Biaka from Central African Republic.

====== B-M108.2 ======
Haplogroup B-M108.2 has been found in 25% (1/4) of a very small sample of Lissongo from Central African Republic.

===== B-P7 =====
Haplogroup B-P7 has been observed most frequently in samples of some populations of pygmies from Central Africa: 67% (12/18) Baka from Central African Republic, 45% (14/31) Biaka from Central African Republic, 21% (10/47) Mbuti from Democratic Republic of the Congo. This haplogroup also has been found in an Iraqw (South Cushitic) individual from Tanzania (1/9 = 11%) and in some samples of Khoisan from Namibia (2/32 = 6% !Kung/Sekele, 2/29 = 7% Tsumkwe San).

====== B-MSY2.1 ======
Haplogroup B-MSY2.1 has been found in 20% (4/20) of a sample of Biaka from Central African Republic.

== Phylogenetics ==
=== Phylogenetic history ===
Prior to 2002, there were in academic literature at least seven naming systems for the Y-Chromosome Phylogenetic tree. This led to considerable confusion. In 2002, the major research groups came together and formed the Y-Chromosome Consortium (YCC). They published a joint paper that created a single new tree that all agreed to use. Later, a group of citizen scientists with an interest in population genetics and genetic genealogy formed a working group to create an amateur tree aiming at being above all timely. The table below brings together all of these works at the point of the landmark 2002 YCC Tree. This allows a researcher reviewing older published literature to quickly move between nomenclatures.

YCC 2002/2008 (Shorthand)	(α)	(β)	(γ)	(δ)	(ε)	(ζ)	(η)	YCC 2002 (Longhand)	YCC 2005 (Longhand)	YCC 2008 (Longhand)	YCC 2010r (Longhand)	ISOGG 2006	ISOGG 2007	ISOGG 2008	ISOGG 2009	ISOGG 2010	ISOGG 2011	ISOGG 2012
B-M60	2	II	1B	5	-	H1	B	B*	B	B	B	B	B	B	B	B	B	B
B-M146	2	II	1B	5	-	H1	B	B1	B1	B1a	B1a	B1a	B1a	B1a	B1a	B1a	B1a	B1a
B-M182	*	*	*	*	*	*	*	*	B2	B2	B2	B2	B2	B2	B2	B2	B2	B2
B-M150	2	II	1B	5	-	H1	B	B2a*	B2a	B2a	B2a	B2a	B2a	B2a	B2a	B2a	B2a	B2a
B-M109	2	II	1B	5	-	H1	B	B2a1	B2a1	B2a1a	B2a1a	B2a1a	B2a1a	B2a1a	B2a1a	B2a1a	B2a1a	B2a1a
B-M108.1	2	II	1B	5	-	H1	B	B2a2*	B2a2	B2a2	B2a2	B2a2	B2a2	B2a2	B2a2	B2a2	removed	removed
B-M43	2	II	1B	5	-	H1	B	B2a2a	B2a2a	B2a2a	B2a2a	B2a2a	B2a2a	B2a2a	B2a2a	B2a2a	B2a2a	B2a2a
B-M112	6	II	1B	6	-	H1	B	B2b*	B2b	B2b	B2b	B2b	B2b	B2b	B2b	B2b	B2b	B2b
B-P6	6	II	1B	7	-	H1	B	B2b1	B2b1	B2b1	B2b1	B2b1	B2b1	B2b1	B2b1	B2b1	B2b1	B2b1
B-M115	6	II	1B	6	-	H1	B	B2b2	B2b2	B2b2	B2b2	B2b2	B2b2	B2b2	B2b2	B2b2	B2b2	B2b2
B-M30	6	II	1B	6	-	H1	B	B2b3*	B2b3	B2b3	B2b3	B2b3	B2b3	B2b3	B2b3	B2b3	B2b3	B2b3
B-M108.2	6	II	1B	6	-	H1	B	B2b3a	B2b3a	B2b3a	B2b3a	B2b3a	B2b3a	B2b3a	B2b3a	B2b3a	removed	removed
B-P7	6	II	1B	8	-	H1	B	B2b4*	B2b4	B2b4	B2b4	B2b4	B2b4	B2b4	B2b4	B2b4	removed	removed
B-P8	6	II	1B	10	-	H1	B	B2b4a	B2b4a	B2b4a	B2b4a	B2b4a	B2b4a	B2b4a	B2b4a	B2b4a	removed	removed
B-M211	6	II	1B	9	-	H1	B	B2b4b	B2b4b	B2b4b	B2b4b	B2b4b	B2b4b	B2b4b	B2b4b	B2b4b	B2b4b	B2b4b

==== Original research publications ====
The following research teams per their publications were represented in the creation of the YCC Tree.

- α Jobling and Tyler-Smith 2000 and Kaladjieva 2001
- β Underhill 2000
- γ Hammer 2001
- δ Karafet 2001
- ε Semino 2000
- ζ Su 1999
- η Capelli 2001

=== Phylogenetic trees ===
The phylogenetic tree of haplogroup B subclades is based on the YCC 2008 tree and subsequent published research.

- B
  - B-M60 (M60, M181, P85, P90)
    - B-M236 (M236, M288)
      - B-M236 (M236)
    - B-M182 (M182)
      - B-M150 (M150)
        - B-M218 (M218)
          - B-M109 (M109, M152, P32)
          - B-G1 (G1)
        - B-M108.1 (M108.1)
          - B-P111 (P111, M43)
      - B-M112 (M112, M192, 50f2(P))
        - B-P6 (P6)
        - B-M115 (M115, M169)
        - B-M30 (M30, M129)
          - B-M108.2 (M108.2)
        - B-P7 (P7)
          - B-P8 (P8, P70)
          - B-MSY2.1 (MSY2.1, M211)
      - B-P112 (P112)

== Notable members ==
American actor Chris Rock, paternally descended from the Uldeme people of northern Cameroon, belongs to Haplogroup B-M60.

== See also ==
=== Genetics ===
- Genetic genealogy
- Haplogroup
- Haplotype
- Human Y-chromosome DNA haplogroup
- Molecular phylogenetics
- Paragroup
- Subclade
- Y-chromosome haplogroups in populations of the world
- Y-DNA haplogroups by ethnic group
- Y-DNA haplogroups in populations of Sub-Saharan Africa

=== Y-DNA B subclades ===
- B-M108.1
- B-M108.2
- B-M109
- B-M112
- B-M115
- B-M146
- B-M150
- B-M182
- B-M211
- B-M30
- B-M43
- B-M60
- B-P6
- B-P7
- B-P8
