= Human Y-chromosome DNA haplogroup =

Human DNA groupings

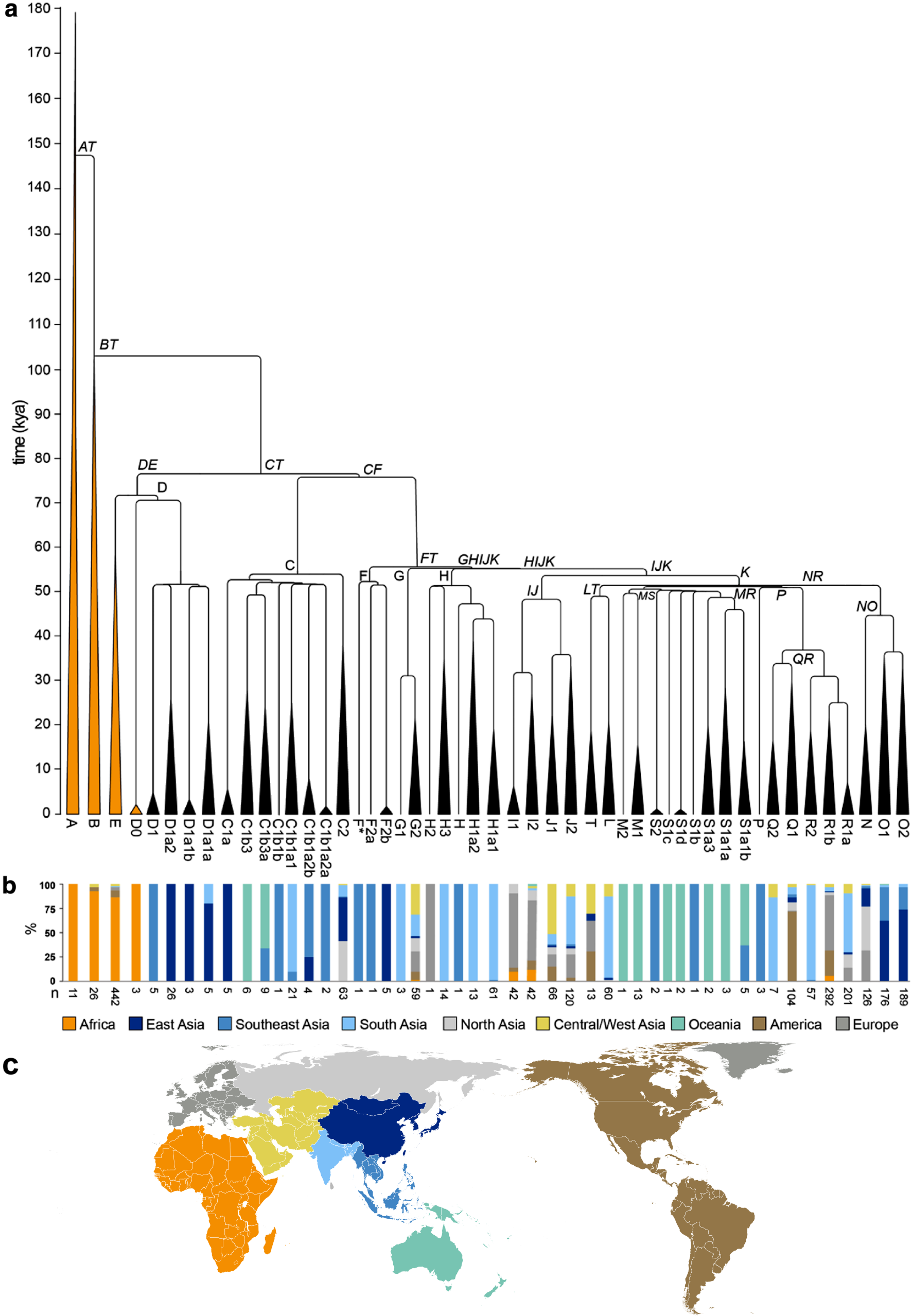
Human Y-DNA phylogeny and haplogroup distribution. (a) Phylogenetic tree. 'kya' means 'thousand years ago'. (b) Geographical distributions of haplogroups are shown in color. (c) Geographical color legend.

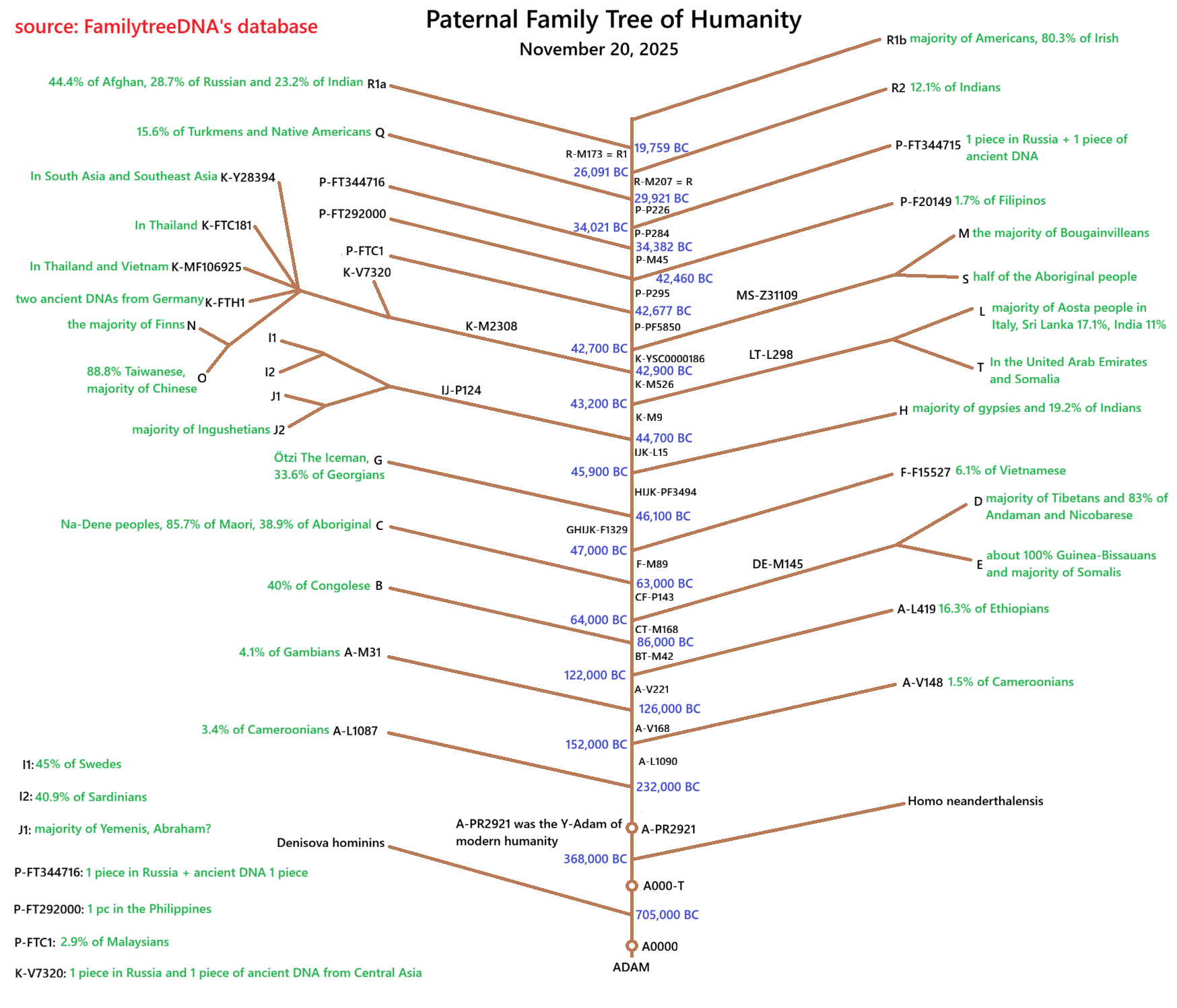
patrilineal family tree of humanity in 2025

In human genetics, a human Y-chromosome DNA (chrY) haplogroup is a haplogroup defined by specific mutations in the non-recombining portions of DNA on the male-specific Y chromosome (Y-DNA). Individuals within a haplogroup share similar numbers of short tandem repeats (STRs) and single-nucleotide polymorphisms (SNPs). The Y-chromosome accumulates approximately two mutations per generation, and Y-DNA haplogroups represent significant branches of the Y-chromosome phylogenetic tree, each characterized by hundreds or even thousands of unique mutations.

The Y-chromosomal most recent common ancestor (Y-MRCA), often referred to as Y-chromosomal Adam, is the most recent common ancestor from whom all currently living humans are descended patrilineally. Y-chromosomal Adam is estimated to have lived around 236,000 years ago in Africa. By examining other population bottlenecks, most Eurasian men trace their descent from a man who lived in Africa approximately 69,000 years ago (Haplogroup CT). One study has suggested that Southeast Asia is the geographic origin for all non-African human Y chromosomes, however another study has disputed this due to the region being outside the possible range for admixture between Neanderthals and modern humans. Other bottlenecks occurred roughly 50,000 and 5,000 years ago, and the majority of Eurasian men are believed to be descended from four ancestors who lived 50,000 years ago, all of whom were descendants of an African lineage (Haplogroup E-M168).

== Naming convention ==
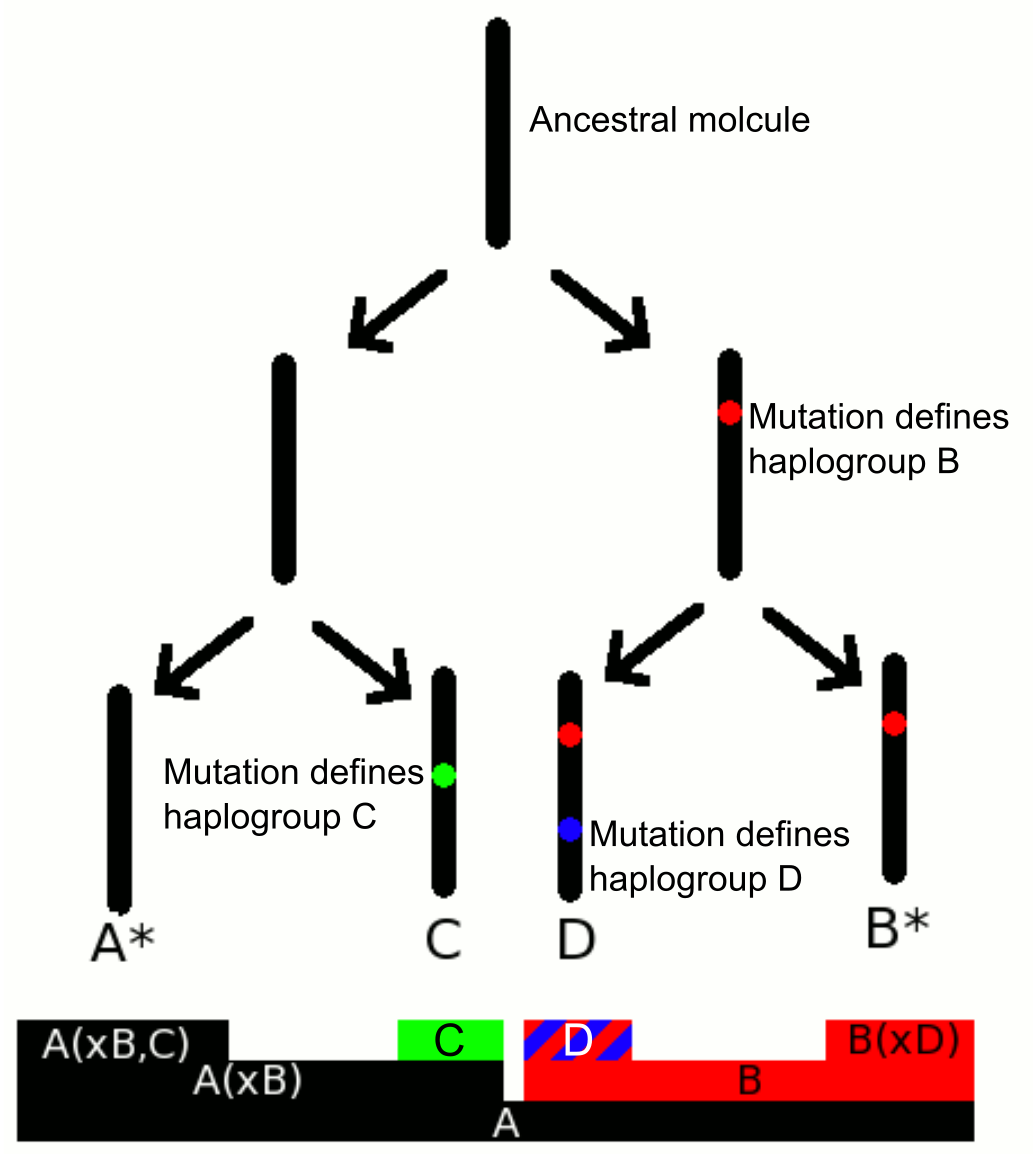
Schematic illustration of Y-DNA haplogroups naming convention. Haplogroups are defined through mutations (SNPs).

Y-DNA haplogroups are defined by the presence of a series of Y-DNA single-nucleotide polymorphisms genetic markers. Subclades are defined by a terminal SNP, the SNP furthest down in the Y-chromosome phylogenetic tree. The Y Chromosome Consortium (YCC) developed a system of naming major Y-DNA haplogroups with the capital letters A through T, with further subclades named using numbers and lower case letters (YCC longhand nomenclature). YCC shorthand nomenclature names Y-DNA haplogroups and their subclades with the first letter of the major Y-DNA haplogroup followed by a dash and the name of the defining terminal SNP.

Y-DNA haplogroup nomenclature is changing over time to accommodate the increasing number of SNPs being discovered and tested, and the resulting expansion of the Y-chromosome phylogenetic tree. This change in nomenclature has resulted in inconsistent nomenclature being used in different sources. This inconsistency, and increasingly cumbersome longhand nomenclature, has prompted a move toward using the simpler shorthand nomenclature.

== Phylogenetic structure ==
Phylogenetic tree of Y-DNA haplogroups

- Y-chromosomal Adam
- - Haplogroup A
  - BT
    - Haplogroup B
    - CT
      - DE
        - Haplogroup D
        - Haplogroup E
      - CF
        - Haplogroup C
        - F
          - Haplogroup G
          - HIJK
            - Haplogroup H
            - IJK
              - IJ
                - Haplogroup I
                - Haplogroup J
              - K
                - LT(K1)
                  - Haplogroup L
                  - Haplogroup T
                - K2
                  - NO(K2a)
                    - Haplogroup N
                    - Haplogroup O
                  - K2b
                    - MS
                      - Haplogroup S
                      - Haplogroup M
                    - P
                      - Haplogroup Q
                      - Haplogroup R

== Major Y-DNA haplogroups ==
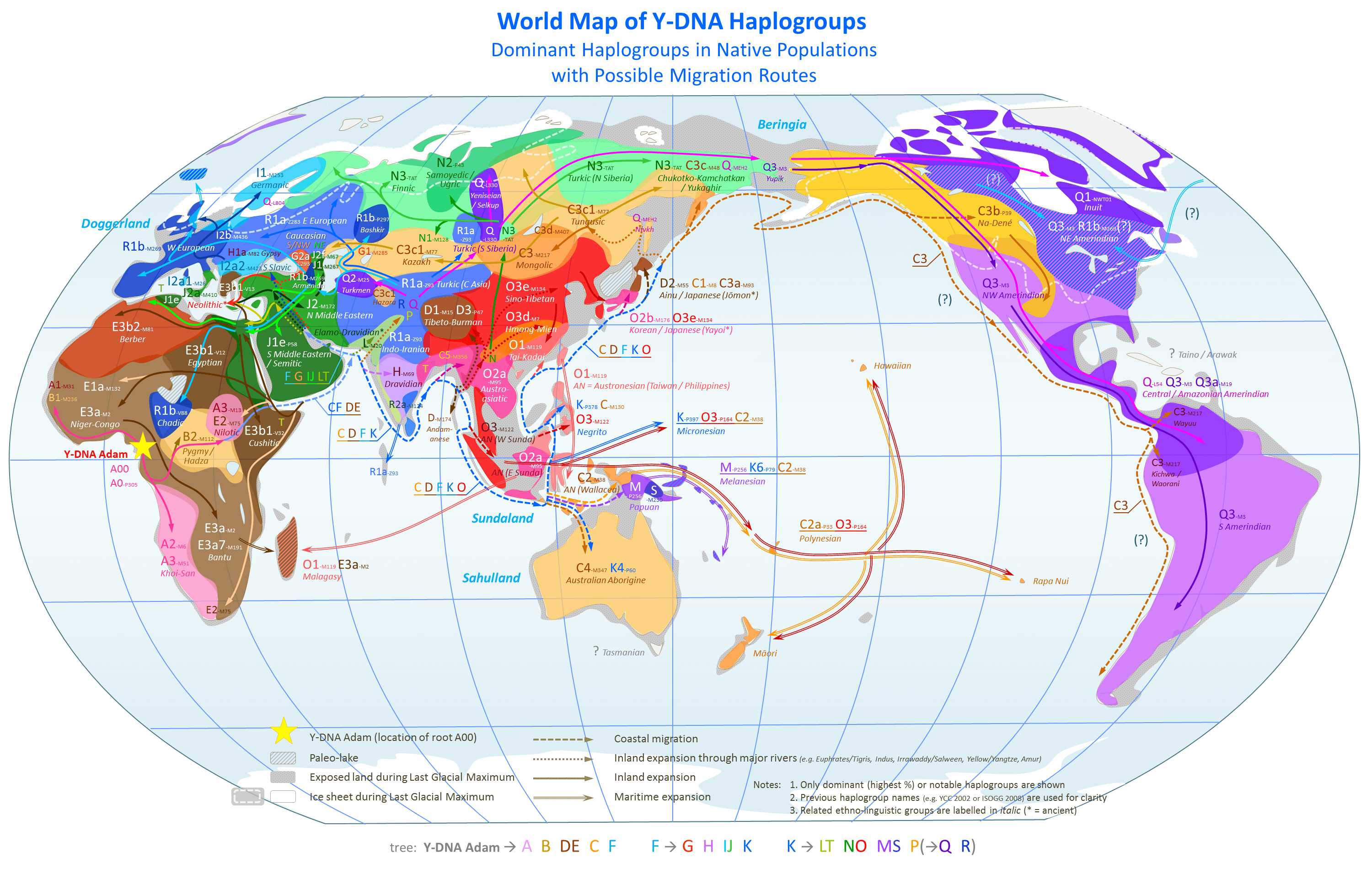
Migration route of human Y-chromosome DNA haplogroups

=== Haplogroups A and B ===
Haplogroup A is the NRY (non-recombining Y) macrohaplogroup from which all modern paternal haplogroups descend. It is sparsely distributed in Africa, being concentrated among Khoisan populations in the southwest and Nilotic populations toward the northeast in the Nile Valley. BT is a subclade of haplogroup A, more precisely of the A1b clade (A2-T in Cruciani et al. 2011), as follows:

- Haplogroup A
  - Haplogroup A00
  - Haplogroup A0 (formerly also A1b)
  - Haplogroup A1 (also A1a-T)
    - Haplogroup A1a (M31)
    - Haplogroup A1b (also A2-T; P108, V221)
      - Haplogroup A1b1a1 (also A2; M14)
      - Haplogroup A1b1b (also A3; M32)
      - Haplogroup BT (M91, M42, M94, M139, M299)
        - Haplogroup B (M60)
        - Haplogroup CT

=== Haplogroup CT (P143) ===
The defining mutations separating CT (all haplogroups except for A and B) are M168 and M294. The site of origin is likely in Africa. Its age has been estimated at 88,000 years old, and more recently at around 100,000 or 101,000 years old.

=== Haplogroup C (M130) ===
- Haplogroup C (M130, M216) Found in Asia, Oceania, and North America
  - Haplogroup C1 (F3393/Z1426)
    - Haplogroup C1a (CTS11043)
      - Haplogroup C1a1 (M8, M105, M131) Found with low frequency in Japan
      - Haplogroup C1a2 (V20) Found with low frequency in Europe, Armenians, and Nepal
    - Haplogroup C1b (F1370, Z16480)
      - Haplogroup C1b1 (AM00694/K281)
        - Haplogroup C1b1a (B66/Z16458)
          - Haplogroup C1b1a1 (M356) Found with low frequency in South Asia, Southwest Asia, and northern China
          - Haplogroup C1b1a2 (B65)
            - Haplogroup C1b1a2a (B67) Found among Lebbo' people in Borneo, Indonesia
            - Haplogroup C1b1a2b (F725) Found among Han Chinese (Guangdong, Hunan, and Shaanxi), Dai people (Yunnan), Murut people (Brunei), Malay people (Singapore), and Aeta people (Philippines)
          - Haplogroup C1b1a3 (Z16582) Found with low frequency in Saudi Arabia and Iraq
        - Haplogroup C1b1b (B68) Found among Dusun people (Brunei)
      - Haplogroup C1b2 (B477/Z31885)
        - Haplogroup C1b2a (M38) Found in Indonesia, New Guinea, Melanesia, Micronesia, and Polynesia
        - Haplogroup C1b2b (M347, P309) Found among the indigenous peoples in Australia
      - Haplogroup C1b3 (C-Z16582)
  - Haplogroup C2 (M217, P44) Found throughout Eurasia and North America, but especially among Mongols, Kazakhs, Tungusic peoples, Paleosiberians, and Na-Dené-speaking peoples

=== Haplogroup D (CTS3946) ===
- Haplogroup D (CTS3946)
  - Haplogroup D1 (M174) Found in Japan, China (especially Tibet), the Andaman Islands
    - Haplogroup D1a (CTS11577)
      - Haplogroup D1a1 (Z27276, Z27283, Z29263)
        - Haplogroup D1a1a (M15) Found mainly in Tibetans, Qiangic peoples, Yi, and Hmong-Mien peoples
        - Haplogroup D1a1b (P99) Found mainly in Tibetans, Qiangic peoples, Naxi, and Turkic peoples
      - Haplogroup D1a2 (M55, M57, M64.1, M179, P12, P37.1, P41.1 (M359.1), 12f2.2) Found mainly in Japan
      - Haplogroup D1a3 (Y34637) Found in Andamanese peoples (Onge, Jarawa)
    - Haplogroup D1b (L1366, L1378, M226.2) Found in Mactan Island, Philippines
  - Haplogroup D2 (A5580.2) Found in Nigeria, Saudi Arabia and Syria

=== Haplogroup E (M96) ===
- Haplogroup E (M40, M96) Found in Africa and parts of the Middle East and Europe
  - Haplogroup E1 (P147)
    - Haplogroup E1a (M33, M132) formerly E1
    - Haplogroup E1b (P177)
      - Haplogroup E1b1 (P2, DYS391p); formerly E3
        - Haplogroup E1b1a (V38)
          - Haplogroup E1b1a1 (M2) Found in Africa, especially among Niger–Congo-speaking populations.; formerly E3a
          - Haplogroup E1b1a2 (M329) Found in Africa, especially in Ethiopia among Omotic-speaking populations.; formerly E3*
        - Haplogroup E1b1b (M215)
          - Haplogroup E1b1b1 (M35) Found in Horn of Africa, North Africa, the Middle East, and Europe (especially in areas near the Mediterranean and the Balkans); formerly E3b
  - Haplogroup E2 (M75)

=== Haplogroup F (M89) ===
The groups descending from haplogroup F are found in some 90% of the world's population, but almost exclusively outside of sub-Saharan Africa.

F xG,H,I,J,K is rare in modern populations and peaks in South Asia, especially Sri Lanka. It also appears to have long been present in South East Asia; it has been reported at rates of 4–5% in Sulawesi and Lembata. One study, which did not comprehensively screen for other subclades of F-M89 (including some subclades of GHIJK), found that Indonesian men with the SNP P14/PF2704 (which is equivalent to M89), comprise 1.8% of men in West Timor, 1.5% of Flores 5.4% of Lembata 2.3% of Sulawesi and 0.2% in Sumatra. F* (F xF1,F2,F3) has been reported among 10% of males in Sri Lanka and South India, 5% in Pakistan, as well as lower levels among the Tamang people (Nepal), and in Iran. F1 (P91), F2 (M427) and F3 (M481; previously F5) are all highly rare and virtually exclusive to regions/ethnic minorities in Sri Lanka, India, Nepal, South China, Thailand, Burma, and Vietnam. In such cases, however, the possibility of misidentification is considered to be relatively high and some may belong to misidentified subclades of Haplogroup GHIJK.

=== Haplogroup G (M201) ===
Haplogroup G (M201) originated some 48,000 years ago and its most recent common ancestor likely lived 26,000 years ago in the Middle East. It spread to Europe with the Neolithic Revolution.

It is found in many ethnic groups in Eurasia; most common in the Caucasus, Iran, Anatolia and the Levant. Found in almost all European countries, but most common in Gagauzia, southeastern Romania, Greece, Italy, Spain, Portugal, Tyrol, and Bohemia with highest concentrations on some Mediterranean islands; uncommon in Northern Europe.

G-M201 is also found in small numbers in northwestern China and India, Bangladesh, Pakistan, Sri Lanka, Malaysia, and North Africa.

- Haplogroup G1
- Haplogroup G2
  - Haplogroup G2a
    - Haplogroup G2a1
    - Haplogroup G2a2
    - Haplogroup G2a3
      - Haplogroup G2a3a
      - Haplogroup G2a3b
        - Haplogroup G2a3b1
    - Haplogroup G2b
    - Haplogroup G2c (formerly Haplogroup G5)
      - Haplogroup G2c1

=== Haplogroup H (M69) ===
Haplogroup H (M69) probably emerged in Southern Central Asia, South Asia or West Asia, about 48,000 years BP, and remains largely prevalent there in the forms of H1 (M69) and H3 (Z5857). Its sub-clades are also found in lower frequencies in Iran, Central Asia, across the middle-east, and the Arabian peninsula.

However, H2 (P96) is present in Europe since the Neolithic and H1a1 (M82) spread westward in the Medieval era with the migration of the Roma people.

=== Haplogroup I (M170) ===
Haplogroup I (M170, M258) is found mainly in Europe and the Caucasus.

- Haplogroup I1 (M253) Found mainly in northern Europe
- Haplogroup I2 (P215) Found mainly in Balkans, southeast Europe and Sardinia save for I2B1 (m223) which is found at a moderate frequency in Western, Central, and Northern Europe.

=== Haplogroup J (M304) ===
Haplogroup J (M304, S6, S34, S35) is found mainly in the Middle East, Caucasus and South-East Europe.

- Haplogroup J* (J-M304*) is rare outside the island of Socotra.
  - Haplogroup J1 (M267) are associated with Northeast Caucasian peoples in Dagestan and Semitic languages speaking people in the Middle East, Ethiopia, and North Africa and also found in Mediterranean Europe in smaller frequencies much like haplogroup T.
  - Haplogroup J2 (M172) is found mainly in the Semitic-speaking peoples, Anatolia, Greece, the Balkans, Italy, Iran, the Caucasus, South Asia, and Central Asia.

=== Haplogroup K (M9) ===
Haplogroup K (M9) is spread all over Eurasia, Oceania and among Native Americans.

K(xLT,K2a,K2b) – that is, K*, K2c, K2d or K2e – is found mainly in Melanesia, Aboriginal Australians, India, Polynesia and Island South East Asia.

=== Haplogroups L and T (K1) ===
Haplogroup L (M20) is found in South Asia, Central Asia, South-West Asia, and the Mediterranean.

Haplogroup T (M184, M70, M193, M272) is found at high levels in the Horn of Africa (mainly Cushitic-speaking peoples), parts of South Asia, the Middle East, and the Mediterranean. T-M184 is also found in significant minorities of Sciaccensi, Stilfser, Egyptians, Omanis, Sephardi Jews, Ibizans (Eivissencs), and Toubou. It is also found at low frequencies in other parts of the Mediterranean and South Asia.

=== Haplogroup K2 (K-M526) ===
The only living males reported to carry the basal paragroup K2* are indigenous Australians. Major studies published in 2014 and 2015 suggest that up to 27% of Aboriginal Australian males carry K2*, while others carry a subclade of K2.

=== Haplogroup N ===
Haplogroup N (M231) is found in northern Eurasia, especially among speakers of the Uralic languages.

Haplogroup N possibly originated in eastern Asia and spread both northward and westward into Siberia, being the most common group found in some Uralic-speaking peoples.

=== Haplogroup O ===
Haplogroup O (M175) is found with its highest frequency in East Asia and Southeast Asia, with lower frequencies in the South Pacific, Central Asia, South Asia, and islands in the Indian Ocean (e.g. Madagascar, the Comoros).

- Haplogroup O1 (F265/M1354, CTS2866, F75/M1297, F429/M1415, F465/M1422)
  - Haplogroup O1a (M119, CTS31, F589/Page20, L246, L466) Found in eastern, central, and southern Mainland China, Taiwan, and Southeast Asia, especially among Austronesian and Tai–Kadai peoples
  - Haplogroup O1b (P31, M268)
    - Haplogroup O1b1 (M95) Found in Japan, China, Taiwan, Southeast Asia, and the Indian subcontinent, especially among Austroasiatic- and Tai–Kadai-speaking peoples, Malays, and Indonesians
    - Haplogroup O1b2 (SRY465, M176) Found in Japan, Korea, Manchuria, and Southeast Asia
- Haplogroup O2 (M122) Found throughout East Asia, Southeast Asia, and Austronesia including Polynesia

=== Haplogroups K2b1, M & S ===
No examples of the basal paragroup K2b1* have been identified. Males carrying subclades of K2b1 are found primarily among Papuan peoples, Micronesian peoples, indigenous Australians, and Polynesians.

Its primary subclades are two major haplogroups:

- Haplogroup S (B254) also known as K2b1a: found in the highlands of Papua New Guinea and;
- Haplogroup M (P256) also known as K2b1b: found in New Guinea and Melanesia.

=== Haplogroup P (K2b2) ===
Haplogroup P (P295) has two primary branches: P1 (P-M45) and the extremely rare P2 (P-B253).

P*, P1* and P2 are found together only on the island of Luzon in the Philippines. In particular, P* and P1* are found at significant rates among members of the Aeta (or Agta) people of Luzon. While, P1* is now more common among living individuals in Eastern Siberia and Central Asia, it is also found at low levels in mainland South East Asia and South Asia. Considered together, these distributions tend to suggest that P* emerged from K2b in South East Asia.

P1 is also the parent node of two primary clades:

- Haplogroup Q (Q-M242) and;
- Haplogroup R (R-M207). These share the common marker M45 in addition to at least 18 other SNPs.

Haplogroup Q (MEH2, M242, P36) found in Siberia and the Americas Haplogroup R (M207, M306): found in Europe, West Asia, Central Asia, and South Asia

=== Haplogroup Q M242 ===
Q is defined by the SNP M242. It is believed to have arisen in Central Asia approximately 32,000 years ago. The subclades of Haplogroup Q with their defining mutation(s), according to the 2008 ISOGG tree are provided below. ss4 bp, rs41352448, is not represented in the ISOGG 2008 tree because it is a value for an STR. This low frequency value has been found as a novel Q lineage (Q5) in Indian populations

The 2008 ISOGG tree

- Q (M242)
  - Q*
  - Q1 (P36.2)
    - Q1*
    - Q1a (MEH2)
      - Q1a*
      - Q1a1 (M120, M265/N14) Found with low frequency among Bhutanese, Dungans, Han Chinese, Japanese, Koreans, Mongolians, Naxi, and Tibetans
      - Q1a2 (M25, M143) Found at low to moderate frequency among some populations of Southwest Asia, Central Asia, and Siberia
      - Q1a3 (M346)
        - Q1a3* Found at low frequency in Pakistan, India, and Tibet
        - Q1a3a (M3) Typical of indigenous peoples of the Americas
          - Q1a3a*
          - Q1a3a1 (M19) Found among some indigenous peoples of South America, such as the Ticuna and the Wayuu
          - Q1a3a2 (M194)
          - Q1a3a3 (M199, P106, P292)
      - Q1a4 (P48)
      - Q1a5 (P89)
      - Q1a6 (M323) Found in a significant minority of Yemeni Jews
    - Q1b (M378) Found at low frequency among samples of Hazara and Sindhis

=== Haplogroup R (M207) ===
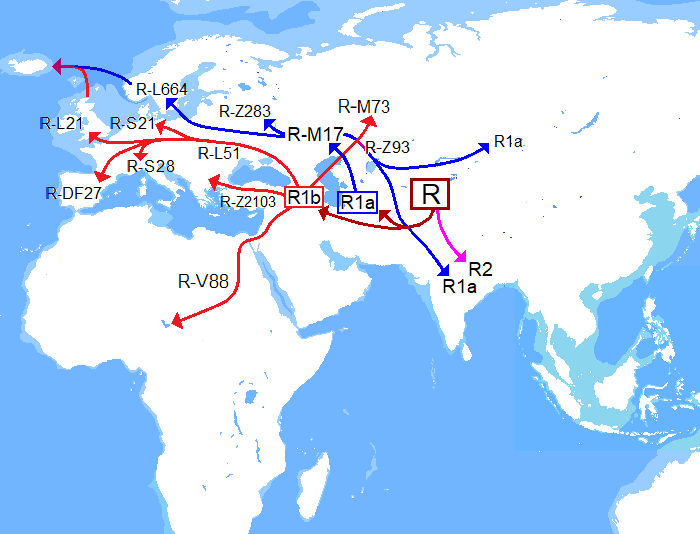
The hypothetical divergence of Haplogroup R and its descendants.

Haplogroup R is defined by the SNP M207. The bulk of Haplogroup R is represented in the descendant subclade R1 (M173), which originated in Siberia. R1 has two descendant subclades: R1a and R1b.

R1a is associated with the proto-Indo-Iranian and Balto-Slavic peoples, and is now found predominantly in Central Asia, South Asia, and Eastern Europe.

Haplogroup R1b is the dominant haplogroup of Western Europe and is also found sparsely distributed among various peoples of Asia and Africa. Its subclade R1b1a2 (M269) is the haplogroup that is most commonly found among modern Western European populations, and has been associated with the Italo-Celtic and Germanic peoples.

- Haplogroup R1 (M173) Found throughout western Eurasia
  - Haplogroup R1a (M420) Found in Central Asia, South Asia, and Central, Northern and Eastern Europe, Balkans
  - Haplogroup R1b (M343) Found in Western Europe, West Asia, Central Asia, North Africa, and northern Cameroon
- Haplogroup R2 (M124) Found in South Asia, Caucasus, Central Asia, and Eastern Europe

== Chronological development of haplogroups ==
Haplogroup	Possible time of origin	Possible place of origin	Possible TMRCA
A00	235,900 or 275,000 years ago	Africa	235,900 years ago
A0-T	235,900	Africa	161,300 years ago
A1	161,300	Africa	133,400 years ago
A1b	133,400	Africa	130,700 years ago
BT	130,700 years ago	Africa	88,000 years ago
CT	88,000 or 101–100,000 years ago	Africa	68,500 years ago
D	72,700	Africa	56,500 years ago
E	65,200, 69,000, or 73,000 years ago	East Africa or Asia	53,100 years ago
F	65,900 years ago	Eurasia	48,800 years ago
G	48,500 years ago	West Asia	25,200 years ago
H	48,500 years ago	South Asia	45,600 years ago
IJ	47,200 years ago	West Asia	42,900 years ago
K	54,100 years ago	Asia	52,000 years ago
P	51,000 years ago	Asia	50,400 years ago
J	42,900 years ago	West Asia	31,600 years ago
I	42,900 years ago	Europe	27,500 years ago
O	41,750 or 36,800 years ago	Central or East Asia	33,900 years ago
E-M215 (E1b1b)	42,300 years ago	East Africa	34,800 years ago
E-V38 (E1b1a)	42,300 years ago	East Africa	40,100 years ago
N	36,800 years ago	Asia	22,100 years ago
E1b1b-M35	34,800 years ago	East Africa	24,100 years ago
R	31,900 years ago	Asia	28,200 years ago
J-M267 (J1)	31,600 years ago	West Asia	18,300 years ago
J-M172 (J2)	31,600 years ago	West Asia	27,800 years ago
R-M173 (R1)	28,200 years ago	Asia	22,800 years ago
I-M253 (I1)	27,500 years ago	Europe	4,600 years ago
I-M438 (I2)	27,500 years ago	Europe	21,800 years ago
R-M420 (R1a)	22,800 years ago	Eurasia	18,200 years ago
R-M343 (R1b)	22,800 years ago	Eurasia	20,400 years ago
I2-L460 (I2a)	21,800 years ago	Europe	21,100 years ago
I2a-P37	21,100 years ago	Europe	18,500 years ago
E1b1b-M78	19,800 years ago	Northeast Africa	13,400 years ago
I2a-M423	18,500 years ago	Europe	13,500 years ago
I2a-M223	17,400 years ago	Europe	12,100 years ago
N1c-M178	14,200 years ago	Asia	11,900 years ago
R1a-M17	14,100 years ago	Eastern Europe	8,500 years ago
R1b-M269	13,300 years ago	Eastern Europe	6,400 years ago
R1b-L151	5,800 years ago	Eastern Europe	4,800 years ago
R1a-Z280	5,000 years ago	Eastern Europe	4,600 years ago
R1a-M458	4,700 years ago	Eastern Europe	4,700 years ago

== See also ==
- List of Y-chromosome haplogroups in populations of the world
- Y-DNA haplogroups in populations of Europe
- Genetic history of Europe
- List of Y-DNA single-nucleotide polymorphisms
- List of Y-STR markers
- Human mitochondrial DNA haplogroup
- * (haplogroup)
- Molecular phylogeny
- Genetic genealogy
- Genealogical DNA test
- Conversion table for Y chromosome haplogroups
