= Haplogroup C-M217 =

Human Y-chromosome DNA haplogroup

Haplogroup C-M217 C2 (previously C3)
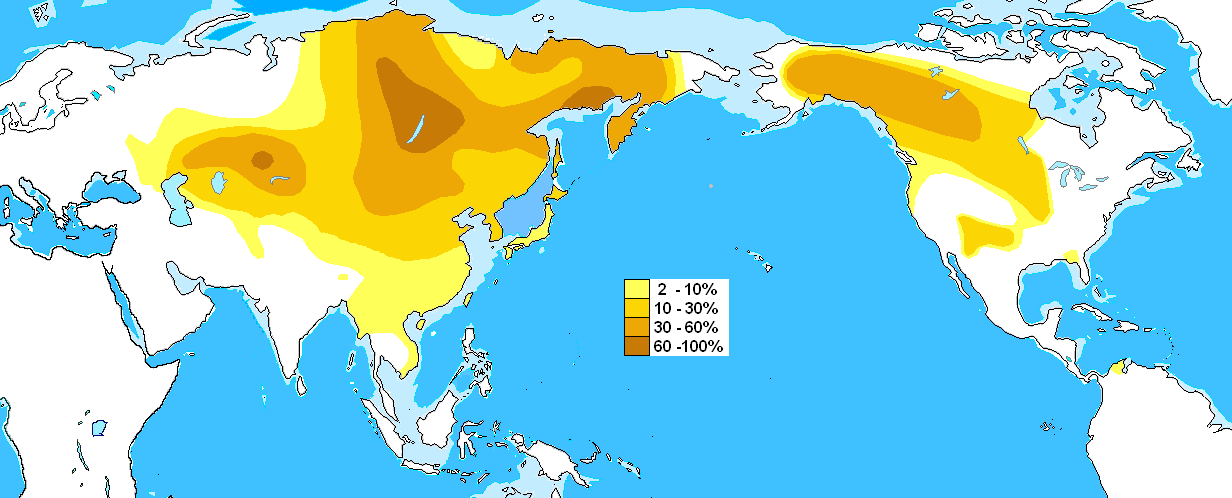
- Possible time of origin: 50,865 [95% CI 38,317 <-> 61,900] ybp 52,500 or 44,900 ybp 48,400 [95% CI 46,000 <-> 50,900] ybp
- Coalescence age: 35,383 [95% CI 25,943 <-> 44,092] ybp 34,000 [95% CI 31,500 <-> 36,700] ybp
- Possible place of origin: Central Asia or East Asia
- Ancestor: C-M130
- Descendants: C-L1373 (C2a); C-F1067 (C2b)
- Defining mutations: M217, P44, PK2
- Highest frequencies: Kazakhs 51.9%Oroqen 61%-91%, Evenks 12.9% - 71%, Ulchi 69%, Nivkhs 38%-71%, Buryats 7%-84%, Evens 5%-74%, Mongolians 52.3% (22.9% China, 24.39% China, 45% Northeast Mongolia, 46.7% Oroqen Autonomous Banner, 47.8% Southeast Mongolia, 52.6% Northwest Mongolia, 53.8% Batsümber, 55% Central and Southwest Mongolia), Tanana 42%, Koryaks 33%-48%, Uzbeks (Afghanistan) 41.2%,Hazaras 35%–40%, Yukaghir 31%, Daur 30.8%-42.5%, Sibe (Xinjiang) 26.8% (11/41) - 29.5% (18/61), Hezhe (Heilongjiang) 23%, Manchu 17.67% (9.3% Bijie - 44.0% Heilongjiang), Tujia ≈21% (16%, 18% Jishou, 21% Guizhou, 23% Hubei, 27% Hunan), North Korean 23% (19%-27%), Altai 22%-24%, Dong 21% (6% Guangxi, 20% Hunan, 22% Hunan, 30% Guizhou), Kyrgyz 20%-26.6%, Uzbeks 20% (Uzbekistan) - 54% (Takhar), Hani 18% (12% Mường Tè, 18%, 22% Yunnan), South Korean 16% (11.6%-21%), Cheyenne 16%, Apache 15%, Northern Han 14.7% (4.3%-29.6%), Tuvans 11% – 15%, Ainu 12.5%-25%, Hui 11%, Sioux 11%, Nogais 14%, Crimean Tatars 9%, Uyghurs 8.27% (0% Ürümqi, 0% Turpan area, 2.6% Keriya, 3.1% Lopnur, 6.0%, 6.0% Ürümqi area, 6.3% Bortala area, 7.0% Yining area, 7.7% Yili, 8.37% Hetian area, 11.8% Horiqol Township, 16.08% Turpan area), Vietnamese 7.6% (4.3%-12.5%), Tajiks (Afghanistan) 7.6% (3.6%-9.2%), Southern Han 7.1% (0%-23.5%), Tabassarans 7%, Abazinians 7%, Japanese 5.9% (0% Tokyo, Okinawa, Aomori, - 7.8% Fukuoka), Adygei 2.9%, Kabardians 2.4%, Pashtuns 2.04%

Haplogroup C-M217, also known as C2 (formerly known as C3), is a Y-chromosome DNA haplogroup. It is the most frequently occurring branch of the wider Haplogroup C (M130). It is found mostly in Central Asia, Eastern Siberia and significant frequencies in parts of East Asia and Southeast Asia including some populations in the Caucasus, West Asia, South Asia, East Europe. It is found in a much more widespread area with a low frequency of less than 2%.

The haplogroup C-M217 is now found at high frequencies among Central Asian peoples, indigenous Siberians, and some Native peoples of North America. In particular, males belonging to peoples such as the Buryats, Evens, Evenks, Itelmens, Tom Tatars, Kalmyks, Kazakhs, Koryaks, Mongolians, Negidals, Nivkhs, Udege, and Ulchi have high levels of M217.

The oldest samples of haplogroup C-M217 were found among Ancient Northeast Asians of the Amur region.

The haplogroup C-M217 is found in Ancient samples of Xiongnu, Göktürks, Uyghurs, Khazars, Kipchaks and Karluks.

One particular haplotype within Haplogroup C2-M217 has received a great deal of attention, because of the possibility that it may represent direct patrilineal descent from Genghis Khan, though that hypothesis is controversial. According to the recent result, C2's subgroups are divided into C2b and C2e, and in Mongolia, most belong to C2b(Genghis Khan modal), while very few are C2e. On the other hand, C2b takes minority and most are C2e in Japan and Korea and Southern East Asia. The specific subclade Haplogroup C3b2b1*-M401(xF5483) of the broader C3b1a3-F3273/M504, M546 subclade, which has been identified as a possible marker of the Manchu Aisin Gioro and has been found in ten different ethnic minorities in northern China, is relatively rare in Han Chinese populations (Heilongjiang, Gansu, Guangdong, Sichuan and Xinjiang).

Y chromosome haplogroup C2c1a1a1-M407 is carried by Mongol descendants of the Northern Yuan ruler from 1474 to 1517, Dayan Khan, who is a male line descendant of Genghis Khan which was found out after geneticists in Mongolia conducted tests on them.
C2b1a3a1c2-F5481 clade of C2*-ST which is also widespread in Central Asia among Kazakhs, Hazaras and ordinary commoner Mongols. The Kerey clan of the Kazakhs have a high amount of the C3* star-cluster (C2*-ST) Y chromosome and is very high among Hazaras, Kazakhs and Mongols in general.

Toghan, Genghis Khan's sixth son has claimed descendants who have Y haplogroup C2b1a1b1-F1756 just like the first son of Genghis Khan, Jochi's descendants in the Kazakh Tore clan.

== Origin ==
After sharing a most recent common ancestor with Haplogroup C-F3393 approximately 48,400 [95% CI 46,000 <-> 50,900] years before present, Haplogroup C-M217 is believed to have begun spreading approximately 34,000 [95% CI 31,500 <-> 36,700] years before present in eastern or central Asia.

The extremely broad distribution of Haplogroup C-M217 Y-chromosomes, coupled with the fact that the ancestral paragroup C is not found among any of the modern Siberian or North American populations among whom Haplogroup C-M217 predominates, makes the determination of the geographical origin of the defining M217 mutation exceedingly difficult. The presence of Haplogroup C-M217 at a low frequency but relatively high diversity throughout East Asia and parts of Southeast Asia makes that region one likely source. In addition, the C-M217 haplotypes found with high frequency among North Asian populations appear to belong to a different genealogical branch from the C-M217 haplotypes found with low frequency among East and Southeast Asians, which suggests that the marginal presence of C-M217 among modern East and Southeast Asian populations may not be due to recent admixture from Northeast or Central Asia.

More precisely, haplogroup C2-M217 is now divided into two primary subclades: C2a-L1373 (sometimes called the "northern branch" of C2-M217) and C2b-F1067 (sometimes called the "southern branch" of C2-M217). The oldest sample with C2-M217 is AR19K in the Amur River basin (19,587-19,175 cal BP).

C2a-L1373 (estimated TMRCA 16,000 [95% CI 14,300 <-> 17,800] ybp) has been found often in populations from Central Asia through North Asia to the Americas, and rarely in individuals from some neighboring regions, such as Europe or East Asia. C2a-L1373 subsumes two subclades: C2a1-F3447 and C2a2-BY63635/MPB374. C2a1-F3447 includes all extant Eurasian members of C2a-L1373, whereas C2a2-BY63635/MPB374 contains extant South American members of C2a-L1373 as well as ancient archaeological specimens from South America and Chertovy Vorota Cave in Primorsky Krai. C2a1-F3447 (estimated TMRCA 16,000 [95% CI 14,700 <-> 17,400] ybp) includes the Y-DNA of an approximately 14,000-year-old specimen from the Ust'-Kyakhta 3 site (located on the right bank of the Selenga River in Buryatia, near the present-day international border with Mongolia) and C2a1b-BY101096/ACT1942 (found in individuals from present-day Liaoning Province of China, South Korea, Japan, and a Nivkh from Russia) in addition to the expansive C2a1a-F1699 clade. C2a1a-F1699 (estimated TMRCA 14,000 [95% CI 12,700 <-> 15,300] ybp) subsumes four subclades: C2a1a1-F3918, C2a1a2-M48, C2a1a3-M504, and C2a1a4-M8574. C2a1a1-F3918 subsumes C2a1a1a-P39, which has been found at high frequency in samples of some indigenous North American populations, and C2a1a1b-FGC28881, which is now found with varying (but generally quite low) frequency all over the Eurasian steppe, from Heilongjiang and Jiangsu in the east to Jihočeský kraj, Podlaskie Voivodeship, and Giresun in the west. Haplogroup C2a1a2-M48 is especially frequent and diverse among present-day Tungusic peoples, but branches of it also constitute the most frequently observed Y-DNA haplogroup among present-day Mongols in Mongolia, Alshyns in western Kazakhstan, and Kalmyks in Kalmykia. Extant members of C2a1a3-M504 all share a relatively recent common ancestor (estimated TMRCA 3,900 [95% CI 3,000 <-> 4,800] ybp), and they are found often among Mongols, Manchus (e.g. Aisin Gioro), Kazakhs (most tribes of the Senior Zhuz as well as the Kerei tribe of the Middle Zhuz), Kyrgyz, and Hazaras. C2a1a4-M8574 is sparsely attested and deeply bifurcated into C-Y176542, which has been observed in an individual from Ulsan and an individual from Japan, and C-Y11990. C-Y11990 is likewise quite ancient (estimated TMRCA 9,300 [95% CI 7,900 <-> 10,700] ybp according to YFull or 8,946 [99% CI 11,792 - 6,625] ybp according to FTDNA) but rare, with one branch (C-Z22425) having been found sporadically in Jammu and Kashmir, Germany, and the United States and another branch (C-ZQ354/C-F8513) having been found sporadically in Slovakia (Prešov Region), China, Turkey, and Kipchak of the central steppe (Lisakovsk 23 Kipchak in Kazakhstan, medieval nomad from 920 ± 25 BP uncal or 1036 - 1206 CE).

The predominantly East Asian distributed C-F1067 subsumes a major clade, C-F2613, and a minor clade, C-CTS4660. The minor clade C-CTS4660 has been found in China (including a Dai and several Han from southern China as well as a Han from Anhui and a Han from Inner Mongolia; according to Chinese genomics company 23mofang, C-CTS4660 is currently mainly concentrated in the Liangguang region of China, accounting for about 0.24% of the national male population) and Thailand (including Northern Thai and Lao Isan). The major clade C-F2613 has known representatives from China (Oroqen, Hezhe, Manchu, Uyghur, Han, Tibetan, Tujia, Dai), Korea, Japan, Laos, Thailand, Vietnam, Bhutan, Bangladesh, Mongolia, Kyrgyzstan (Dungan, Kyrgyz), Tajikistan (Tajik), Afghanistan (Hazara, Tajik), Pakistan (Burusho, Hazara), Nakhchivan, Chechnya, and Syria and includes the populous subclades C-F845, C-CTS2657, and C-Z8440. C-M407, a notable subclade of C-CTS2657, has expanded in a post-Neolithic time frame to include large percentages of modern Buryat, Soyot, and Hamnigan males in Buryatia and Barghut males in Hulunbuir in addition to many Kalmyks and other Mongols and members of the Qongirat tribe in Kazakhstan (but only 2 or 0.67% of a sample of 300 Korean males).

The specific subclade haplogroup C3b2b1*-M401(xF5483) has been identified as a possible marker of the Aisin Gioro and is found in ten different ethnic minorities in northern China, but completely absent from Han Chinese.

Genetic testing also showed that the haplogroup C3b1a3a2-F8951 of the Aisin Gioro family came to southeastern Manchuria after migrating from their place of origin in the Amur river's middle reaches, originating from ancestors related to Daurs in the Transbaikal area. The Tungusic speaking peoples mostly have C3c-M48 as their subclade of C3 which drastically differs from the C3b1a3a2-F8951 haplogroup of the Aisin Gioro which originates from Mongolic speaking populations like the Daur. Jurchen (Manchus) are a Tungusic people. The Mongol Genghis Khan's haplogroup C3b1a3a1-F3796 (C3*-Star Cluster) is a fraternal "brother" branch of C3b1a3a2-F8951 haplogroup of the Aisin Gioro. A genetic test was conducted on seven men who claimed Aisin Gioro descent with three of them showing documented genealogical information of all their ancestors up to Nurhaci. Three of them turned out to share the C3b2b1*-M401(xF5483) haplogroup, out of them, two of them were the ones who provided their documented family trees. The other four tested were unrelated. The Daur Ao clan carries the unique haplogroup subclade C2b1a3a2-F8951, the same haplogroup as Aisin Gioro and both Ao and Aisin Gioro only diverged merely a couple of centuries ago from a shared common ancestor. Other members of the Ao clan carry haplogroups like N1c-M178, C2a1b-F845, C2b1a3a1-F3796 and C2b1a2-M48. People from northeast China, the Daur Ao clan and Aisin Gioro clan are the main carriers of haplogroup C2b1a3a2-F8951. The Mongolic C2*-Star Cluster (C2b1a3a1-F3796) haplogroup is a fraternal branch to Aisin Gioro's C2b1a3a2-F8951 haplogroup.

== Distribution ==
Haplogroup C-M217 is the modal haplogroup among Mongolians and most indigenous populations of the Russian Far East, such as the Buryats, Northern Tungusic peoples, Nivkhs, Koryaks, and Itelmens. The subclade C-P39 is common among males of the indigenous North American peoples whose languages belong to the Na-Dené phylum. The frequency of Haplogroup C-M217 tends to be negatively correlated with distance from Mongolia and the Russian Far East, but it still comprises more than ten percent of the total Y-chromosome diversity among the Manchus, Koreans, Ainu, and some Turkic peoples of Central Asia. Beyond this range of high-to-moderate frequency, which contains mainly the northeast quadrant of Eurasia and the northwest quadrant of North America, Haplogroup C-M217 continues to be found at low frequencies, and it has even been found as far afield as Northwest Europe, Turkey, Pakistan, Bhutan, Bangladesh, Nepal and adjacent regions of India, Vietnam, Maritime Southeast Asia, and the Wayuu people of South America. It is found in Ossetians 4.7% (1/21), and in Russians 0.73% (3/406), frequency ranges depending on the district. It is found 0.2% in Central/Southern Russia but 0.9% Rovslav and 0.7% Belgorod. It is found 0.5% in ethnic Bulgarians but 1.2% in Montana Province, 0.8% Sofia Province and 1.4% in an unknown area some of whom exhibit divergent Y-STR haplotypes. Haplogroup C-M127 also has been found with high frequency in a small sample of Uzbeks from Takhar, Afghanistan (7/13 = 54% C-M217).

In an early study of Japanese Y-chromosomes, haplogroup C-M217 was found relatively frequently among Ainus (2/16=12.5% or 1/4=25%) and among Japanese of the Kyūshū region (8/104=7.7%). However, in other samples of Japanese, the frequency of haplogroup C-M217 was found to be only about one to three percent. In a study published in 2014, large samples of males from seven different Japanese cities were examined, and the frequency of C-M217 varied between a minimum of 5.0% (15/302 university students in Sapporo) and a maximum of 7.8% (8/102 adult males in Fukuoka), with a total of 6.1% (146/2390) of their sampled Japanese males belonging to this haplogroup; the authors noted that no marked geographical gradient was detected in the frequencies of haplogroups C-M217 or C-M8 in that study.

The frequency of Haplogroup C-M217 in samples of Han from various areas has ranged from 0% (0/27) in a sample of Han from Guangxi in southern China to 23.5% (4/17) in a sample of Han from Shanghai in eastern China, 23.5% (8/34) in a sample of Han from Xi'an in northwestern China, and 29.6% (8/27) in a sample of Han from Jilin in northeastern China, with the frequency of this haplogroup in several studies' pools of all Han samples ranging between 6.0% and 12.0%. C-M217 also has been found in many samples of ethnic minority populations from central and southern China, such as Dong (8/27 = 29.6% from Guizhou, 10/45 = 22.2% from Hunan, 1/17 = 5.9% from Guangxi), Bulang (3/11 = 27.3% from Yunnan), Tujia (6/26 = 23.1% from Hubei, 7/33 = 21.2% from Guizhou, 9/49 = 18.4% from Jishou, Hunan), Hani (13/60 = 21.7% from Yunnan, 6/34 = 17.6%), Yi (4/32 = 12.5% Boren from Yunnan, 3/24 = 12.5% Yi from Sichuan, 4/61 = 6.6% Yi from Yunnan), Mulao (1/11 = 9.1% from Guangxi), Naxi (1/12 = 8.3% from Yunnan), Miao (7/92 = 7.6% from Guizhou, 2/58 = 3.4%), Shui (2/29 = 6.9% from Guizhou), She (3/47 = 6.4% from Fujian, 1/34 = 2.9%), Wa (1/16 = 6.3% from Yunnan), Dai (1/18 = 5.6% from Yunnan), Gelao (1/21 = 4.8% from Guizhou), ethnic Vietnamese (2/45 = 4.4% from Guangxi), Yao (1/28 = 3.6% from Guangdong, 1/35 = 2.9% from Liannan, Guangdong, 2/113 = 1.8% from Guangxi), Bai (1/34 = 2.9% from Yunnan), Tibetans (4/156 = 2.6%), Buyi (2/109 = 1.8% from Guizhou), and Taiwanese aborigines (1/48 = 2.1%).

In Vietnam, Y-DNA that belongs to haplogroup C-M217 has been found in about 7.5% of all published samples, including 12.5% (6/48) of a sample of Vietnamese from Hanoi, Vietnam, 11.8% (9/76) of another sample of Kinh ("ethnic Vietnamese") from Hanoi, Vietnam, 10% (1/10) of a sample from Vietnam, 8.5% (5/59) of a sample of Cham people from Binh Thuan, Vietnam, 8.3% (2/24) of another sample of Vietnamese from Hanoi, 4.3% (3/70) of a sample of Vietnamese from an unspecified location in Vietnam, 2.2% (1/46) of the KHV ("Kinh in Ho Chi Minh City, Vietnam") sample of the 1000 Genomes Project, and 0% (0/27) of one study's samples of Kinh and Muong. Macholdt et al. (2020) have found Y-DNA that belongs to haplogroup C-M217 in 4.67% (28/600) of a set of samples from Vietnam, including 26.8% (11/41) of a sample of Hmong from Điện Biên Phủ, 13.9% (5/36) of a sample of Pathen from Quang Bình District, 12.1% (4/33) of a sample of Hanhi from Mường Tè District, 10.3% (3/29) of a sample of Sila from Mường Tè District, and 10.0% (5/50) of a sample of Kinh (n=42 from Hanoi, including all five members of haplogroup C-M217).

Haplogroup C-M217 has been found less frequently in other parts of Southeast Asia and nearby areas, including Myanmar (3/72 = 4.2% Bamar and Rakhine), Laos (1/25 = 4.0% Lao from Luang Prabang), Malaysia (2/18 = 11.1% Malaysia, 0/8 Malaysia, 0/12 Malaysian (ordinary Malay near Kuala Lumpur), 0/17 Orang Asli, 0/27 Malay, 0/32 Malaysia), Java (1/37 = 2.7%, 1/141 = 0.71%), Nepal (2/77 = 2.6% general population of Kathmandu), Thailand (1/40 = 2.5% Thai, mostly sampled in Chiang Mai; 13/500 = 2.6% Northern Thailand, or 11/290 = 3.8% Northern Thai people and 2/91 = 2.2% Tai Lü), the Philippines (1/48 = 2.1%, 1/64 = 1.6%), and Bali (1/641 = 0.2%).

Although C-M217 is generally found with only low frequency (<5%) in Tibet and Nepal, there may be an island of relatively high frequency of this haplogroup in Meghalaya, India. The indigenous tribes of this state of Northeast India, where they comprise the majority of the local population, speak Khasian languages or Tibeto-Burman languages. A study published in 2007 found C-M217(xM93, P39, M86) Y-DNA in 8.5% (6/71) of a sample of Garos, who primarily inhabit the Garo Hills in the western half of Meghalaya, and in 7.6% (27/353) of a pool of samples of eight Khasian tribes from the eastern half of Meghalaya (6/18 = 33.3% Nongtrai from the West Khasi Hills, 10/60 = 16.7% Lyngngam from the West Khasi Hills, 2/29 = 6.9% War-Khasi from the East Khasi Hills, 3/44 = 6.8% Pnar from the Jaintia Hills, 1/19 = 5.3% War-Jaintia from the Jaintia Hills, 3/87 = 3.4% Khynriam from the East Khasi Hills, 2/64 = 3.1% Maram from the West Khasi Hills, and 0/32 Bhoi from Ri-Bhoi District).

== Phylogenetics ==
=== Phylogenetic history ===
Prior to 2002, there were in academic literature at least seven naming systems for the Y-Chromosome Phylogenetic tree. This led to considerable confusion. In 2002, the major research groups came together and formed the Y-Chromosome Consortium (YCC). They published a joint paper that created a single new tree that all agreed to use. Later, a group of citizen scientists with an interest in population genetics and genetic genealogy formed a working group to create an amateur tree aiming at being above all timely. The table below brings together all of these works at the point of the landmark 2002 YCC Tree. This allows a researcher reviewing older published literature to quickly move between nomenclatures.

YCC 2002/2008 (Shorthand)	(α)	(β)	(γ)	(δ)	(ε)	(ζ)	(η)	YCC 2002 (Longhand)	YCC 2005 (Longhand)	YCC 2008 (Longhand)	YCC 2010r (Longhand)	ISOGG 2006	ISOGG 2007	ISOGG 2008	ISOGG 2009	ISOGG 2010	ISOGG 2011	ISOGG 2012
C-M216	10	V	1F	16	Eu6	H1	C	C*	C	C	C	C	C	C	C	C	C	C
C-M8	10	V	1F	19	Eu6	H1	C	C1	C1	C1	C1	C1	C1	C1	C1	C1	C1	C1
C-M38	10	V	1F	16	Eu6	H1	C	C2*	C2	C2	C2	C2	C2	C2	C2	C2	C2	C2
C-P33	10	V	1F	18	Eu6	H1	C	C2a	C2a	C2a1	C2a1	C2a	C2a	C2a1	C2a1	C2a1	removed	removed
C-P44	10	V	1F	17	Eu6	H1	C	C3*	C3	C3	C3	C3	C3	C3	C3	C3	C3	C3
C-M93	10	V	1F	17	Eu6	H1	C	C3a	C3a	C3a	C3a	C3a	C3a	C3a	C3a	C3a	C3a	C3a1
C-M208	10	V	1F	17	Eu6	H1	C	C3b	C2b	C2a	C2a	C2b	C2b	C2a	C2a	C2a	C2a	C2a
C-M210	36	V	1F	17	Eu6	H1	C	C3c	C2c	C4a	C4a	C4b	C4b	C4a	C4a	C4a	C4a	C4a

=== Phylogenetic structure ===
- C2 (M217)
  - C2a (L1373, F1396)
    - C2a1 (F3447)
      - C2a1a (F1699)
        - C2a1a1 (F3918)
          - C2a1a1a (P39^^, Z30536)
            - C2a1a1a1 (BY1360/Z30568)
              - C2a1a1a1a (Z30538)
                - C2a1a1a1a1 (Z30750)
                  - C2a1a1a1a1a (Z30754)
                - C2a1a1a1a2 (BY736/Z30764)
                  - C2a1a1a1a2a (Z30765)
                  - C2a1a1a1a2c (BY22870)
              - C2a1a1a1b (Z38940)
            - C2a1a1a2 (Z38874)
          - C2a1a1b (FGC28881.2)
            - C2a1a1b1 (F1756, F3985)
              - C2a1a1b1a (F3830)
                - C2a1a1b1a1 (Z32845)
                - C2a1a1b1a2 (F10085/FGC28855)
                  - C2a1a1b1a2a (F9721/FGC28841)
                    - C2a1a1b1a2a1 (FGC28846)
                      - C2a1a1b1a2a1b (FGC31362)
                    - C2a1a1b1a2a2 (BY186297/Y160383)
              - C2a1a1b1b (Y10420/Z30402)
                - C2a1a1b1b1 (Y11606/Z30408)
        - C2a1a2 (M48)
          - C2a1a2a (M86, M77)
            - C2a1a2a1~
              - C2a1a2a1a (B469)
                - C2a1a2a1a1 (B87)
                  - C2a1a2a1a1a (B89)
              - C2a1a2a1b (B80)
                - C2a1a2a1b1 (B471)
                - C2a1a2a1b2 (B81)
                  - C2a1a2a1b2b (B82)
            - C2a1a2a2 (F6379/Y12792)
              - C2a1a2a2a (F5485/SK1064/Y12825)
                - C2a1a2a2a1 (Y15844)
                  - C2a1a2a2a1a (Y15552)
                    - C2a1a2a2a1a1 (BY18743/Y33019)
                    - C2a1a2a2a1a2 (MPB421/Y22661)
                    - C2a1a2a2a1a3 (Y17342)
                - C2a1a2a2a2 (SK1066)
                - C2a1a2a2a3 (F12970/Y15849)
                  - C2a1a2a2a3a (F9936)
                    - C2a1a2a2a3a1 (F9766)
              - C2a1a2a2b (F8472/PH36)
          - C2a1a2b (B90)
            - C2a1a2b1 (B91)
              - C2a1a2b1b (B92)
        - C2a1a3 (M504)
          - C2a1a3a (F3796)
            - C2a1a3a1 (F5481/FGC16328/SK1075/Y4541)
              - C2a1a3a1e (Y12782)
                - C2a1a3a1e2 (F5483/SK1074)
                - C2a1a3a1e3 (BY18686^^)
              - C2a1a3a1f (F10091/ZQ31)
              - C2a1a3a1i (BY182928)
            - C2a1a3a6 (SK1072)
              - C2a1a3a6a (Y148768/ZQ369)
                - C2a1a3a6a1 (FT37001)
              - C2a1a3a6b (F12663)
        - C2a1a4 (F9992/Y12018/Z30601)
          - C2a1a4a (Z22425)
            - C2a1a4a1~
              - C2a1a4a1a (BY56585)
      - C2a1b (Z31698)
    - C2a2 (BY63635/MPB374)
      - C2a2b (BY67935/MPB375)
  - C2b (F1067)
    - C2b1 (F2613/Z1338)
      - C2b1a (Z1300)
        - C2b1a1 (CTS2657)
          - C2b1a1a (CTS11990)
            - C2b1a1a1 (CTS8579)
              - C2b1a1a1a (M407)
                - C2b1a1a1a1 (F3850)
                  - C2b1a1a1a1a (B97)
                    - C2b1a1a1a1a5 (B98)
                  - C2b1a1a1a1c (B99)
                - C2b1a1a1a2 (Z45401)
            - C2b1a1a2 (Z31664)
              - C2b1a1a2a (Z31665)
          - C2b1a1b (A14895)
            - C2b1a1b1 (A14909)
        - C2b1a2 (K700/Z12209, F3880)
          - C2b1a2a (F1319)
            - C2b1a2a1 (F3777)
              - C2b1a2a1a (F9966)
                - C2b1a2a1a1 (F3748)
                - C2b1a2a1a2 (BY53999)
                  - C2b1a2a1a2a (FT40406)
            - C2b1a2a2 (F10056/Z36838)
              - C2b1a2a2b (F3555)
                - C2b1a2a2b1 (F10036)
                  - C2b1a2a2b1a (F13864)
                    - C2b1a2a2b1a2 (F13136)
                      - C2b1a2a2b1a2b (BY96205)
                        - C2b1a2a2b1a2b1 (MF4473)
          - C2b1a2b (CTS3385)
            - C2b1a2b2 (FGC45548)
      - C2b1b (F845)
        - C2b1b1 (CTS10923)
          - C2b1b1a (K511)
            - C2b1b1a1 (K516)
          - C2b1b1b (F5477/SK1036)
            - C2b1b1b2 (SK1038)
              - C2b1b1b2a (MF1017)
                - C2b1b1b2a1 (MF1020)
          - C2b1b1d
            - C2b1b1d2 (Z43981)
          - C2b1b1g (Z45293)
        - C2b1b2 (MF2091)
    - C2b2 (CTS4660^)

== See also ==
=== Genetics ===
- African admixture in Europe
- Genetic genealogy
- Haplogroup
- Haplotype
- Human Y-chromosome DNA haplogroup
- Molecular phylogenetics
- Paragroup
- Subclade
- Y-chromosome haplogroups in populations of the world
- Y-DNA haplogroups by ethnic group
- Y-DNA haplogroups in populations of East and Southeast Asia
- Y-DNA haplogroups in populations of Oceania

=== Y-DNA C subclades ===
- Mega-Haplogroup CF
- Mega-Haplogroup CT
- C-M130
- C-M208
- C-M210
- C-M216
- C-M217
- C-M38
- C-M8
- C-M93
- C-P33
- C-P44

== Sources ==
- Lee, Joo-Yup (18 October 2017). "A Comparative Analysis of Chinese Historical Sources and y-dna Studies with Regard to the Early and Medieval Turkic Peoples". Inner Asia. 19 (2): 218–219. doi:10.1163/22105018-12340089. ISSN 2210-5018.
