= Haplogroup C1b2 =

Haplogroup C1b2 may refer to subclades of:

- Haplogroup C-F3393 (Y-DNA), also known as C1, which includes the subclade
  - Haplogroup C-B477 or C1b2 which is common among Oceanian males, or;
- Haplogroup C (mtDNA)
