= Haplogroup C1b =

Haplogroup C1b may refer to

- a primary subclade of Haplogroup C-F3393 (Y-DNA), also known as C1, including
  - Haplogroup C-B477 or C1b2 which is common among Oceanian males, or;
- a secondary subclade of Haplogroup C (mtDNA)
