= Haplogroup K2b1a =

Haplogroup K2b1a may refer to:

- a subclade of Haplogroup K (mtDNA)
- Haplogroup K2b1a (Y-DNA)
