= Haplogroup C-M130 =

Human Y chromosome DNA grouping found primarily in Asia

Haplogroup C
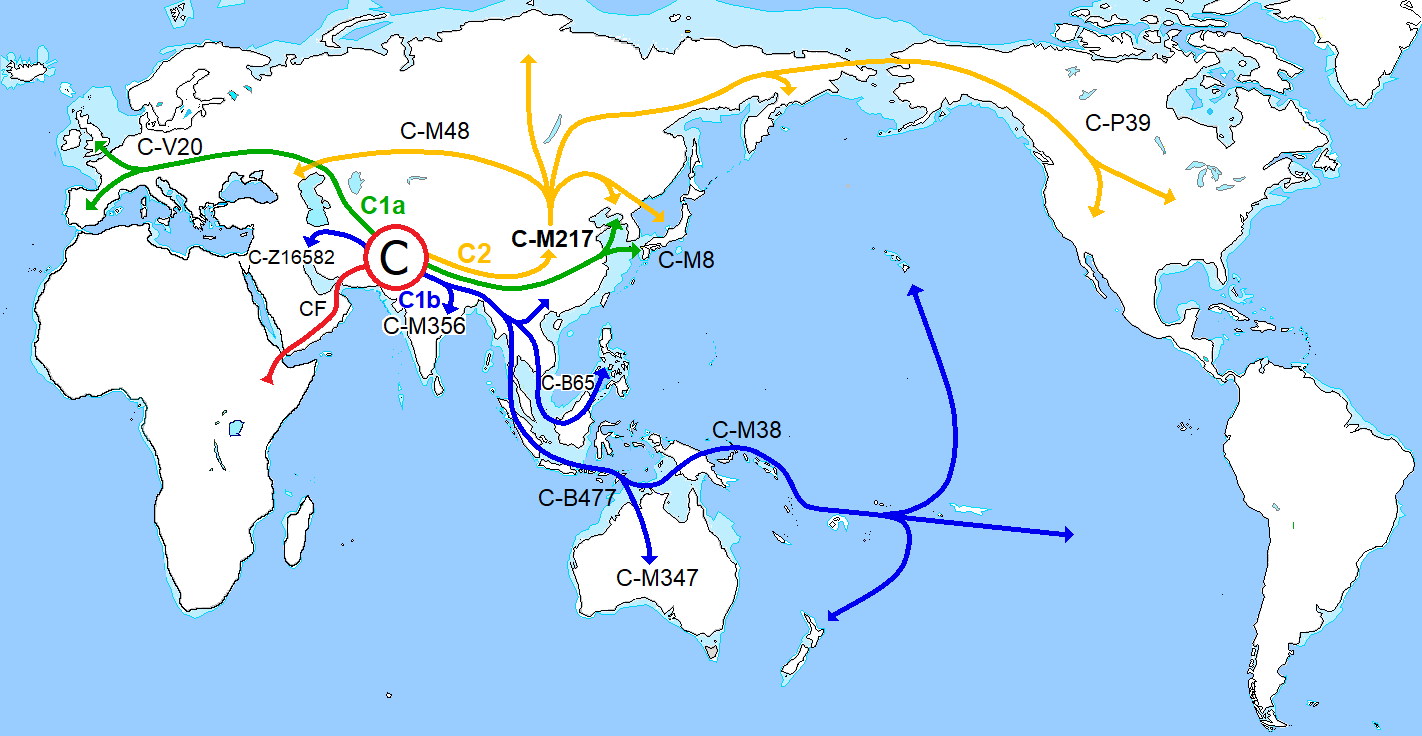
- Possible time of origin: 53,000 years BP
- Possible place of origin: Southwest Asia (via out-of-Africa expansion)
- Ancestor: CF
- Descendants: C1 F3393/Z1426 (previously CxC3); C2 M217 (previously C3*)
- Defining mutations: M130/RPS4Y711, P184, P255, P260

Haplogroup C is a major Y-chromosome haplogroup, defined by UEPs M130/RPS4Y711, P184, P255, and P260, which are all SNP mutations. It is one of two primary branches of haplogroup CF alongside haplogroup F.

Haplogroup C is found in ancient populations on every continent except Africa and is the predominant Y-DNA haplogroup among males belonging to many peoples indigenous to East Asia, Central Asia, Siberia, North America and Australia as well as some populations in Europe, the Levant, and later Japan. The haplogroup is also found with moderate to low frequency among many present-day populations of Southeast Asia, South Asia, and Southwest Asia.

In addition to the basal paragroup C*, this haplogroup now has two major branches: C1 (F3393/Z1426; previously CxC3, i.e. old C1, old C2, old C4, old C5 and old C6) and C2 (M217; the former C3).

== Origins ==
Haplogroup C-M130 is likely associated with the exodus of modern humans out of Africa, between 50,000 to 70,000 years ago, through the Red Sea in Southwest Asia that rapidly colonized South Asia, East Asia and Oceania. Phylogeographic analysis supports a southern dispersal route, in which the carriers of haplogroup C migrated along the coasts of India and Southeast Asia to get to East Asia and Oceania.

Haplogroup C-M130 seems to have come into existence shortly after SNP mutation M168 occurred for the first time, bringing the modern haplogroup CT into existence, from which haplogroup CF, and in turn haplogroup C, derived. This was probably at least 60,000 years ago.

Haplogroup C-M130 attains its highest frequencies among the indigenous populations of Kazakhstan, Mongolia, the Russian Far East, Polynesia, certain groups of Australia, and at moderate frequency in Korea and Manchu people. It is therefore hypothesized that haplogroup C-M130 either originated or underwent its longest period of evolution in the greater Central Asian region or in Southeast Asian regions. Its expansion in East Asia is suggested to have started approximately 40,000 years ago.

Males carrying C-M130 are believed to have migrated to the Americas some 6,000 to 8,000 years ago, and was carried by Na-Dené-speaking peoples into the northwest Pacific coast of North America.

Asia is also the area in which haplogroup D-M174 is concentrated. However, D-M174 is more closely related to haplogroup E than to C-M130 and the geographical distributions of haplogroups C-M130 and D-M174 are entirely and utterly different, with various subtypes of Haplogroup C-M130 being found at high frequency amongst modern Kazakhs and Mongolians as well as in some Indigenous peoples of the Americas, Manchurians. It is also found at a medium frequency in Koreans, indigenous inhabitants of the Russian Far East, certain Aboriginal Australians groups and at moderate frequencies elsewhere throughout Asia and Oceania. Carriers of haplogroup C among the later Jōmon people of Japan and certain Paleolithic and Neolithic Europeans carried C1a, C1b, and C1a2. Whereas haplogroup D is found at high frequencies only amongst Tibetans, Japanese peoples, and Andaman Islanders, and has been found neither in India nor among the aboriginal inhabitants of the Americas or Oceania.

According to Sakitani et al., haplogroup C-M130 likely diverged soon after the out-of-Africa exodus in Southwest Asia and spread from there into other parts of Eurasia and into parts of Australia. It is suggested that C-M130 was found in samples of ancient hunter gatherers found across Asia and Europe.

== Structure ==
- C (M130/Page51/RPS4Y711, M216)
  - C1 (F3393/Z1426)
    - C1a (CTS11043)
      - C1a1 (M8)
        - C1a1a (P121)
          - C1a1a1 (CTS9336)
            - C1a1a1a (Z7180)
              - C1a1a1a1 (CTS6678^)
            - C1a1a1b (Z1356)
              - C1a1a1b2 (Z40544)
      - C1a2 (V20)
        - C1a2a (V182)
          - C1a2a1 (V222)
            - C1a2a1a (Y12152/Z28813)
              - C1a2a1a1 (BY1117/Z31808)
                - C1a2a1a1a (Z31799)
              - C1a2a1a2 (Y12157/Z30466)
                - C1a2a1a2a (BY44466)
            - C1a2a1b (BY67541)
              - C1a2a1b1 (BY98578)
          - C1a2a2 (Y11325/Z29329)
        - C1a2b (Z38888)
          - C1a2b1 (BY22666/Z44467)
            - C1a2b1a (Z44576)
              - C1a2b1a1 (Y140262)
            - C1a2b1b (Z44526)
              - C1a2b1b1 (PH188.2)
              - C1a2b1b2 (F18203)
    - C1b (F1370)
      - C1b1 (AM00694/K281)
        - C1b1a (B66/Z16458)
          - C1b1a1 (SK991/Z16459)
            - C1b1a1a (M356)
              - C1b1a1a1 (P92)
                - C1b1a1a1a (Z5895)
                  - C1b1a1a1a1 (K159)
                    - C1b1a1a1a1a (K96)
                      - C1b1a1a1a1a1 (K42)
                        - C1b1a1a1a1a1a (Z5896)
                          - C1b1a1a1a1a1a1 (K193)
                            - C1b1a1a1a1a1a1a (Z12522)
                              - C1b1a1a1a1a1a1a1 (K466)
                                - C1b1a1a1a1a1a1a1a (K470)
                                  - C1b1a1a1a1a1a1a1a1 (Z5898)
              - C1b1a1a2 (Z5899)
                - C1b1a1a2a (Z12338)
                  - C1b1a1a2a1 (Z5900)
                  - C1b1a1a2a2 (SK994)
            - C1b1a1b (Z16582)
          - C1b1a2 (AM00847/AMM008/B65)
            - C1b1a2a (B67)
            - C1b1a2b (AM00594/Z33070)
              - C1b1a2b1 (AM00627/Z33098)
                - C1b1a2b1a (B465)
      - C1b2 (B477/Z31885)
        - C1b2a (M38)
          - C1b2a1 (M208)
            - C1b2a1b~
              - C1b2a1b1 (P54)
            - C1b2a1c (F21693)
              - C1b2a1c1 (B460)
                - C1b2a1c1b (B461)
              - C1b2a1c2 (FT12310^^)
                - C1b2a1c2a (B459)
                - C1b2a1c2b (FT12484)
                  - C1b2a1c2b1 (FT13521)
                    - C1b2a1c2b1a (FT13115)
                  - C1b2a1c2b2 (FT134718)
                    - C1b2a1c2b2a (FT133144)
                      - C1b2a1c2b2a1 (FT133627)
                  - C1b2a1c2b3 (FT232409)
                    - C1b2a1c2b3a (FT245596)
          - C1b2a2 (FT71404)
            - C1b2a2b (F2642.3/S2169.3)
        - C1b2b (M347, P309)
          - C1b2b1 (M210)
  - C2 (M217)
    - C2a (L1373, F1396)
      - C2a1 (F3447)
        - C2a1a (F1699)
          - C2a1a1 (F3918)
            - C2a1a1a (P39^^, Z30536)
              - C2a1a1a1 (BY1360/Z30568)
                - C2a1a1a1a (Z30538)
                  - C2a1a1a1a1 (Z30750)
                    - C2a1a1a1a1a (Z30754)
                  - C2a1a1a1a2 (BY736/Z30764)
                    - C2a1a1a1a2a (Z30765)
                    - C2a1a1a1a2c (BY22870)
                - C2a1a1a1b (Z38940)
              - C2a1a1a2 (Z38874)
            - C2a1a1b (FGC28881.2)
              - C2a1a1b1 (F1756, F3985)
                - C2a1a1b1a (F3830)
                  - C2a1a1b1a1 (Z32845)
                  - C2a1a1b1a2 (F10085/FGC28855)
                    - C2a1a1b1a2a (F9721/FGC28841)
                      - C2a1a1b1a2a1 (FGC28846)
                        - C2a1a1b1a2a1b (FGC31362)
                      - C2a1a1b1a2a2 (BY186297/Y160383)
                - C2a1a1b1b (Y10420/Z30402)
                  - C2a1a1b1b1 (Y11606/Z30408)
          - C2a1a2 (M48)
            - C2a1a2a (M86, M77)
              - C2a1a2a1~
                - C2a1a2a1a (B469)
                  - C2a1a2a1a1 (B87)
                    - C2a1a2a1a1a (B89)
                - C2a1a2a1b (B80)
                  - C2a1a2a1b1 (B471)
                  - C2a1a2a1b2 (B81)
                    - C2a1a2a1b2b (B82)
              - C2a1a2a2 (F6379/Y12792)
                - C2a1a2a2a (F5485/SK1064/Y12825)
                  - C2a1a2a2a1 (Y15844)
                    - C2a1a2a2a1a (Y15552)
                      - C2a1a2a2a1a1 (BY18743/Y33019)
                      - C2a1a2a2a1a2 (MPB421/Y22661)
                      - C2a1a2a2a1a3 (Y17342)
                  - C2a1a2a2a2 (SK1066)
                  - C2a1a2a2a3 (F12970/Y15849)
                    - C2a1a2a2a3a (F9936)
                      - C2a1a2a2a3a1 (F9766)
                - C2a1a2a2b (F8472/PH36)
            - C2a1a2b (B90)
              - C2a1a2b1 (B91)
                - C2a1a2b1b (B92)
          - C2a1a3 (M504)
            - C2a1a3a (F3796)
              - C2a1a3a1 (F5481/FGC16328/SK1075/Y4541)
                - C2a1a3a1e (Y12782)
                  - C2a1a3a1e2 (F5483/SK1074)
                  - C2a1a3a1e3 (BY18686^^)
                - C2a1a3a1f (F10091/ZQ31)
                - C2a1a3a1i (BY182928)
              - C2a1a3a6 (SK1072)
                - C2a1a3a6a (Y148768/ZQ369)
                  - C2a1a3a6a1 (FT37001)
                - C2a1a3a6b (F12663)
          - C2a1a4 (F9992/Y12018/Z30601)
            - C2a1a4a (Z22425)
              - C2a1a4a1~
                - C2a1a4a1a (BY56585)
        - C2a1b (Z31698)
      - C2a2 (BY63635/MPB374)
        - C2a2b (BY67935/MPB375)
    - C2b (F1067)
      - C2b1 (F2613/Z1338)
        - C2b1a (Z1300)
          - C2b1a1 (CTS2657)
            - C2b1a1a (CTS11990)
              - C2b1a1a1 (CTS8579)
                - C2b1a1a1a (M407)
                  - C2b1a1a1a1 (F3850)
                    - C2b1a1a1a1a (B97)
                      - C2b1a1a1a1a5 (B98)
                    - C2b1a1a1a1c (B99)
                  - C2b1a1a1a2 (Z45401)
              - C2b1a1a2 (Z31664)
                - C2b1a1a2a (Z31665)
            - C2b1a1b (A14895)
              - C2b1a1b1 (A14909)
          - C2b1a2 (K700/Z12209, F3880)
            - C2b1a2a (F1319)
              - C2b1a2a1 (F3777)
                - C2b1a2a1a (F9966)
                  - C2b1a2a1a1 (F3748)
                  - C2b1a2a1a2 (BY53999)
                    - C2b1a2a1a2a (FT40406)
              - C2b1a2a2 (F10056/Z36838)
                - C2b1a2a2b (F3555)
                  - C2b1a2a2b1 (F10036)
                    - C2b1a2a2b1a (F13864)
                      - C2b1a2a2b1a2 (F13136)
                        - C2b1a2a2b1a2b (BY96205)
                          - C2b1a2a2b1a2b1 (MF4473)
            - C2b1a2b (CTS3385)
              - C2b1a2b2 (FGC45548)
        - C2b1b (F845)
          - C2b1b1 (CTS10923)
            - C2b1b1a (K511)
              - C2b1b1a1 (K516)
            - C2b1b1b (F5477/SK1036)
              - C2b1b1b2 (SK1038)
                - C2b1b1b2a (MF1017)
                  - C2b1b1b2a1 (MF1020)
            - C2b1b1d
              - C2b1b1d2 (Z43981)
            - C2b1b1g (Z45293)
          - C2b1b2 (MF2091)
      - C2b2 (CTS4660^)

== Distribution ==
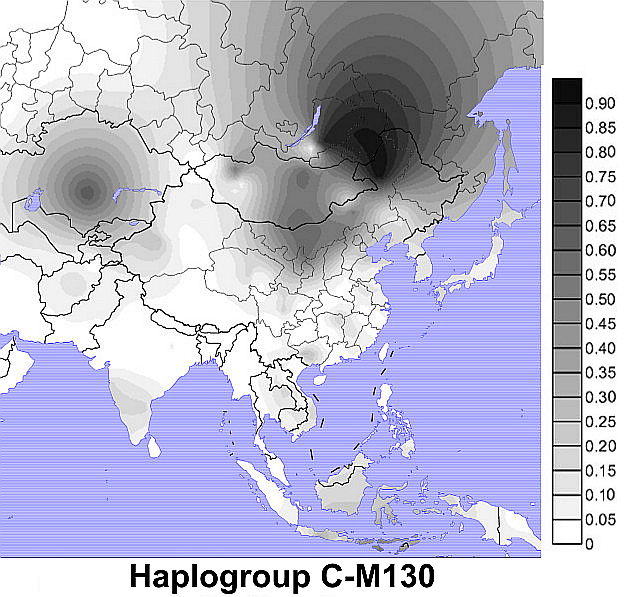
Projected spatial frequency distribution for haplogroup C in East Asia.

The distribution of haplogroup C-M130 is generally limited to populations of Siberia, parts of East Asia, Oceania, and the Americas. Due to the tremendous age of haplogroup C-M130, numerous secondary mutations have had time to accumulate, and many regionally important subbranches of Haplogroup C-M130 have been identified.

Up to 46% of Aboriginal Australian males carried either basal C* (C-M130*) and, C1b2b* (C-M347*) or C1b2b1 (C-M210), before contact with and significant immigration by Europeans, according to a 2015 study by Nagle et al. That is, 20.0% of the Y-chromosomes of 657 modern individuals, before 56% of those samples were excluded as "non-indigenous". C-M130* was apparently carried by up to 2.7% of Aboriginal males before colonisation; 43% carried C-M347, which has not been found outside Australia. The other major Y-DNA haplogroup of Aboriginal Australians is K2* (25–30%). Otherwise they are similar to Papuans and Negrito populations of Southeast Asia (haplogroups S-M230 and M-P256).

Low levels of C-M130* are carried by males:

- from the Indian subcontinent, Sri Lanka and Southeast Asia, and;
- in Europe among males with the surname Llach originating from Garrotxa, Catalonia, Spain (but not males with the same surname from other areas).

Basal C1a* (CTS11043) was found in the Upper Paleolithic European (Aurignacian), GoyetQ116-1.

C1b was identified in prehistoric remains, dating from 34,000 years BP, found in Russia and known as "Kostenki 14".

Haplogroup C2 (M217), the most numerous and widely dispersed C lineage, was once believed to have originated in Central Asia, spread from there into Northern Asia and the Americas while other theory it originated from East Asia. C-M217 stretches longitudinally from Central Europe and Turkey, to the Wayuu people of Colombia and Venezuela, and latitudinally from the Athabaskan peoples of Alaska to Vietnam to the Malay Archipelago. Found at low concentrations in Eastern Europe, where it may be a legacy of the invasions/migrations of the Huns, Turks and/or Mongols during the Middle Ages. Found at especially high frequencies in Buryats, Daurs, Hazaras, Itelmens, Kalmyks, Koryaks, Manchus, Mongolians, Oroqens, and Sibes, with a moderate distribution among other Tungusic peoples, Koreans, Ainus, Nivkhs, Altaians, Tuvinians, Uzbeks, Han Chinese, Tujia, Hani, and Hui. The highest frequencies of haplogroup C-M217 are found among the populations of Mongolia and Far East Russia, where it is the modal haplogroup. Haplogroup C-M217 is the only subclade of haplogroup C-M130 to be found among Native Americans, among whom it reaches its highest frequency in Na-Dené populations. It is possible that this lineage may have been part of the founding populations of the Americas as this is the only subclade found amongst the indigenous populations.

Other subclades are specific to certain populations, within a restricted geographical range; even where these other branches are found, they tend to appear as a very low-frequency, minor component of the palette of Y-chromosome diversity within those territories:

- C-M8 (C1a1), is now found regularly only with low frequency (approximately 5%; range 3.3–10% of all samples) in Japan. It also has been found in an academic study in one individual on Jeju Island and in commercial testing in one individual who has reported an origin in Liaoning province of China and one individual who has reported an origin in Seoul. The ancient Jōmon people had a frequency of about 30% of C1a1.
- C-V20 (C1a2; previously C6) is found at low frequencies amongst Europeans. The 7,000-year-old remains of a hunter-gatherer from La Braña (modern Asturias, Spain) carried it, and C1a2 was also present in Hungary at around the same time. In 2016, a 35,000-year-old remains of a hunter gatherer from the Goyet Caves (Namur, Belgium) and a 30,000-year-old remains of a hunter gatherer from Dolni Vestonice (Vestonice16, Moravia, Czech Republic) were found with this haplogroup.
- C-B66/Z16458 (C1b1a) is found at low frequencies in South Asia, Central Asia, and Southwest Asia.
- C-M356 (C1b1a1; previously C5) has been detected with low frequency in samples from India, Nepal, Pakistan, Afghanistan, Arabia, and northern China.
- C-M38 (C1b2a; previously C2), among some local populations within Indonesia, Melanesia (especially New Guinea), Micronesia, and some islands of Polynesia, C-M38 has become the modal haplogroup, probably due to severe founder effects and genetic drift.
- C-P33 (C1b2a1a) is found at high frequencies among Polynesian males.
- C-P55 (C1b3) is found at low frequency in the New Guinea Highlands.
- C-M93 (C2a) is found sporadically in Japanese people.
- C-L1373/F1396 (C2b) has been identified in Central Asia.
- C-P39 (C2b1a1a) is found among several indigenous peoples of North America, including some Na-Dené-, Algonquian- and Siouan-speaking populations.
- C-M48 (C2b1b; previously C3c) is found at high frequencies in northern Tungusic peoples, Kazakhs, Oirats, Kalmyks, Mongolians, Yukaghirs, Nivkhs, Koryaks, Itelmens, and Udegeys, with a moderate distribution among southern Tungusic peoples, Buryats, Tuvinians, Yakuts, Chukchi, Kyrgyz, Uyghurs, Uzbeks, Karakalpaks, and Tajiks.
- C-P53.1 (C2c) is borne by about 10% of Xinjiang Sibe males, with low frequency in Mongolia and among Evenks, Ningxia Hui, Xizang Tibetan, Xinjiang Uyghur, and Gansu Han.
- C-F2613/Z1338 (C2e): both Central Asia and East Asia.
- C-M407 (C2e1a1a) has been found with high frequency among Barghuts, Buryats, Soyots, and Khamnigans, moderate frequency among other Mongols and Kalmyks, and low frequency in Armenian, Bai, Cambodian, Evenk, Han Chinese, Japanese, Kazakh, Korean, Manchu, Teleut, Tujia, Tuvinian, Uyghur, and Yakut populations.
- C-P343 occurs at a high frequency among males from Lembata (17.4% of 92 samples), with lower frequencies in Flores, Pantar, and Timor. P343 is outside C1a1 (M8), C1b2a (M38), C2 (ex-C3; M217), C1b2b (previously C4; M347), or C1b1a1 (previously C5; M356), but its relation to other branches is not yet tested.

Unspecified instances of C-M130, which possibly may belong to one of the above subclades, include:

- Kayser et al. (2006) found C-M130(xM38, 390.1del, M217) in 10.3% (4/39) of a sample of ethnic minority groups from the Philippines, 10.0% (6/60) of a sample from Arnhem Land, 6.5% (2/31) of a sample from Nusa Tenggara, 5.3% (3/57) of a sample from Sumatra, 3.0% (1/33) of a sample from the Papua New Guinea coast, 2.9% (1/34) of a sample from the Moluccas, 1.9% (1/53) of a sample from Java, and 0.9% (1/107) of a sample from Fiji.
- C-RPS4Y (now C-RPS4Y711) (xM38) Y-DNA is quite common among populations of the Indonesian province of East Nusa Tenggara and independent East Timor: 13/31 = 41.9% Lembata, 16/71 = 22.5% Flores, 5/43 = 11.6% Solor, 10/96 = 10.4% Adonara, 3/39 = 7.7% East Timor, 1/26 = 3.8% Alor, 1/38 = 2.6% Pantar. All C-RPS4Y(xM38) individuals except the singleton from Alor were described as Austronesian speakers.
- C-RPS4Y (now C-RPS4Y711) (xM38, M217) Y-DNA occurs, according to a study published in 2010, at rather high frequencies in most populations of central Indonesia (115/394 = 29.2% Flores, 21/92 = 22.8% Lembata, 19/86 = 22.1% Borneo, 6/54 = 11.1% Mandar, 1/9 = 11.1% Timor, but only 1/350 = 0.3% Sumba). C-RPS4Y(xM38, M217) Y-DNA generally becomes rare toward the west (2/61 = 3.3% Java, 1/32 = 3.1% Malaysia, 9/641 = 1.4% Balinese, 0/38 Batak Toba, 0/60 Nias, but 10/74 = 13.5% Mentawai) and toward the east (1/28 = 3.6% Alor, 0/30 Moluccas, 1/15 = 6.7% PNG Coast, 0/33 PNG Highland, 0/10 Nasioi, 0/44 Maewo (Vanuatu), 1/16 = 6.3% Micronesia, 0/64 Polynesia).
- C-RPS4Y711(xM8, M217) Y-DNA has been found in 17% (6/35) of a sample of Yao from Bama, Guangxi in south-central China, 4/35 = 11% of a sample of Hui and 2/70 = 3% of a pair of samples of Uyghur from northwestern China, and 3/45 = 7% of a sample of Hezhe and 1/26 = 4% of a sample of Ewenki from northeastern China.
- C-RPS4Y711(xM8, M38, M217) has been found in 48.5% (16/33) of a sample of indigenous Australians, 20% (12/60) of a sample of Yao, 6.1% (3/49) of a sample of Tujia, 5.9% (1/17) of a sample of Micronesians, 5.5% (3/55) of a sample of eastern Indonesians, 4.0% (1/25) of a sample of western Indonesians, 3.3% (3/91) of a sample of Sri Lankans, 3.1% (1/32) of a sample of Malays, 2.5% (10/405) of a sample of Indians, 2.2% (1/46) of a sample of Papua New Guineans, 1.7% (1/58) of a sample of Miao, and 1.5% (1/67) of a sample of Uyghurs.
- Zhong et al. (2010) have found C-M130(xM8, M38, M217, M347, M356, P55) Y-DNA in 9.09% (1/11) of a sample of Mulao from Guangxi, 8.20% (5/61) of a sample of Hui from Ningxia, 7.96% (9/113) of a sample of Yao from Guangxi, 7.69% (2/26) of a sample of Tujia from Hubei, 6.90% (2/29) of a sample of Shui from Guizhou, 3.28% (2/61) of a sample of Xibe from Xinjiang, 1.45% (1/69) of a sample of Zhuang from Guangxi, 0.92% (1/109) of a sample of Buyi from Guizhou, 0.87% (2/231) of a sample of Han from Guizhou, and 0.74% (1/136) of a sample of Han from Yunnan. A majority of these individuals share an identical 8-loci Y-STR haplotype: DYS19=15, DYS389I=12, DYS389b=16, DYS388=13, DYS390=21, DYS391=10, DYS392=11, DYS393=12.
- Di Cristofaro et al. (2013) have found C-M130(xC2-PK2/M386, C1b1a1-M356) in 1.9% (1/53) of a sample of Pashtun from Kunduz, Afghanistan and in 1.4% (1/69) of a sample of Hazara from Bamiyan, Afghanistan.
- Wang et al. (2014) have found C-M130(xM105, M38, M217, M347, M356) in 5.6% (1/18) of a sample of Horpa Qiang from Danba County of Sichuan, China and in 2.2% (1/46) of a sample of Khams Tibetans from Xinlong County of Sichuan, China. The Y-STR haplotypes of these two individuals match the modal C* haplotype from the study by Zhong et al. (2010) at every comparable locus.
- "C-M216", an SNP that is now regarded as synonymous with C-M130(xM8, M38, M217, M210, M356) have been found in 3.9% (3/77) of a sample of the general population of Kathmandu, Nepal. Other examples of C-M216 have been reported among Mongol and Turkic peoples, including the: Jalairs, Kazakhs, Merkits, Jochids and Uzbeks;

== Phylogenetics ==
=== Phylogenetic history ===
Prior to 2002, there were in academic literature at least seven naming systems for the Y-Chromosome Phylogenetic tree. This led to considerable confusion. In 2002, the major research groups came together and formed the Y-Chromosome Consortium (YCC). They published a joint paper that created a single new tree that all agreed to use. The table below brings together all of these works at the point of the landmark 2002 YCC Tree. This allows a researcher reviewing older published literature to quickly move between nomenclatures.

YCC 2002/2008 (Shorthand)	(α)	(β)	(γ)	(δ)	(ε)	(ζ)	(η)	YCC 2002 (Longhand)	YCC 2005 (Longhand)	YCC 2008 (Longhand)	YCC 2010r (Longhand)	ISOGG 2006	ISOGG 2007	ISOGG 2008	ISOGG 2009	ISOGG 2010	ISOGG 2011	ISOGG 2012
C-M216	10	V	1F	16	Eu6	H1	C	C*	C	C	C	C	C	C	C	C	C	C
C-M8	10	V	1F	19	Eu6	H1	C	C1	C1	C1	C1	C1	C1	C1	C1	C1	C1	C1
C-M38	10	V	1F	16	Eu6	H1	C	C2*	C2	C2	C2	C2	C2	C2	C2	C2	C2	C2
C-P33	10	V	1F	18	Eu6	H1	C	C2a	C2a	C2a1	C2a1	C2a	C2a	C2a1	C2a1	C2a1	removed	removed
C-P44	10	V	1F	17	Eu6	H1	C	C3*	C3	C3	C3	C3	C3	C3	C3	C3	C3	C3
C-M93	10	V	1F	17	Eu6	H1	C	C3a	C3a	C3a	C3a	C3a	C3a	C3a	C3a	C3a	C3a	C3a1
C-M208	10	V	1F	17	Eu6	H1	C	C3b	C2b	C2a	C2a	C2b	C2b	C2a	C2a	C2a	C2a	C2a
C-M210	36	V	1F	17	Eu6	H1	C	C3c	C2c	C4a	C4a	C4b	C4b	C4a	C4a	C4a	C4a	C4a

==== Research publications ====
The following research teams per their publications were represented in the creation of the YCC Tree.

- α Jobling and Tyler-Smith 2000 and Kaladjieva 2001
- β Underhill 2000
- γ Hammer 2001
- δ Karafet 2001
- ε Semino 2000
- ζ Su 1999
- η Capelli 2001

== Notable members ==
One particular haplotype within haplogroup C-M217 has received a great deal of attention for the possibility that it may represent direct patrilineal descent from Genghis Khan.

A 2017 research paper, "Genetic trail for the early migrations of Aisin Gioro, the imperial house of the Qing dynasty," confirmed that the Aisin Gioro clan belongs to haplogroup C3b1a3a2-F8951, a brother branch of C3*-Star Cluster (currently named as C3b1a3a1-F3796, once linked to Genghis Khan).

== See also ==
=== Genetics ===
- Genetic genealogy
- Haplogroup
- Haplotype
- Human Y-chromosome DNA haplogroup
- Molecular phylogeny
- Paragroup
- Subclade
- Y-chromosome haplogroups in populations of the world
- Y-DNA haplogroups by ethnic group
- Y-DNA haplogroups in populations of East and Southeast Asia
- Y-DNA haplogroups in populations of Oceania

=== Y-DNA C subclades ===
- Haplogroup CT
- Haplogroup CF
- C-M130
- C-M208
- C-M210
- C-M216
- C-M217
- C-M38
- C-M8
- C-M93
- C-P33
- C-P44
