= Haplogroup C =

Haplogroup C may refer to:

- Haplogroup C (mtDNA), a human mitochondrial DNA (mtDNA) haplogroup
- Haplogroup C (Y-DNA), a human Y-chromosome (Y-DNA) haplogroup
