= Haplogroup S1a (Y-DNA) =

Human Y-DNA haplogroup

- Possible place of origin: Maritime Southeast Asia or Oceania
- Ancestor: S1 (S-B255)
- Descendants: S-P405
- Defining mutations: Z41335, Z41336, Z41337, Z41338, Z41339, Z41340, Z41341

Haplogroup S1a is a human Y-DNA haplogroup, defined by SNPs Z41335, Z41336, Z41337, Z41338, Z41339, Z41340, and Z41341.

S1a is found primarily in Melanesia (especially in Papua New Guinea), Micronesia, Maritime Southeast Asia and among indigenous Australians.

As of 2017, it includes an unnamed primary subclade referred to by ISOGG as "S1a~" (P405), (which was previously known as K2b1a). The "~" symbol is ISOGG's way of indicating that an unverified and as-yet unnamed immediate ancestor may exist.

Its secondary subclades include: S1a1 (Z42413), S1a2~ (P79, P307) and S1a3 (P315).

Before 2016, S1a1b (M230, P202, P204) was known as Haplogroup S* (and before that as Haplogroup K5). (In 2016, haplogroup S-B254 was "promoted" to S*, from its previous position of S1.)

The "sibling" clades of S1a include: S1b (B275, Z33756, Z33757, Z33758, Z33759), S1c (Z41926, Z41927, Z41928, Z41929, Z41930) and S1d (SK1806).

== Phylogeny ==
Haplogroup S1 (B255) includes the following subclades:
S1a Z41335

- S1a1 Z42413
  - S1a1a
    - S1a1a1 P60, P304, P308
    - S1a1a2
  - S1a1b M230, P202, P204 – "demoted" from its previous position as the basal Haplogroup S* (and known before that as Haplogroup K5)
    - S1a1b1 M254 (previously known as K2b1a4a)
      - S1a1b1a P57
      - S1a1b1b P61
      - S1a1b1c P83
      - S1a1b1d SK1891
- S1a2 P79, P307
- S1a3 P315
  - S1a3a Z41763
  - S1a3b~ P401

S1b~ B275, Z33756, Z33757, Z33758, Z33759
S1c~ Z41926, Z41927, Z41928, Z41929, Z41930
S1d SK1806
(Based on the 2017 ISOGG tree and subsequent published research.)

== Distribution ==
Basal S1a* appears to be extremely rare or extinct in living males. The primary subclade S-P405* is also relatively rare, but is found at significant levels among various Micronesian populations: 5.6%. It is also found among males on the Indonesian island of Sumba at a rate of 0.2%.

According to ISOGG (2017), S1a1 (Z42413) has been found among the Lebbo' people of Indonesia and S1a1a1 (P60) among indigenous Australians. One study has reported finding S-M230 (S1a1b) in: 52% (16/31) of a sample from the Papua New Guinea (PNG) Highlands; 21% (7/34) of a sample from the Moluccas (Maluku); 16% (5/31) of a sample from the Papua New Guinea coast; 12.5% (2/16) of a sample of Tolai from New Britain; 10% (3/31) of a sample from Nusa Tenggara, and; 2% (2/89) of a sample from the West New Guinea lowlands/coast. One subclade, Haplogroup S1a1b1d1a (S-M226.1) has been found at low frequencies in the Admiralty Islands and along the coast of mainland PNG.

The distribution of the other major subclades of S1a according to ISOGG, is as follows:

- S1a2 (P79) – Melanesia and Papua New Guinea, including the Admiralty Islands;
- S1a3 (P315) – indigenous Australians and;
- S1a3b (P401) – Vanuatu.
