= Haplogroup S-M230 =

Human Y-chromosome DNA haplogroup

Haplogroup S-M230 (S1a1b)
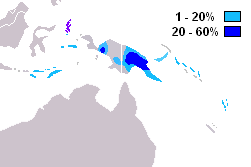
- Possible time of origin: 28,000-41,000 years before present (Scheinfeldt 2006)
- Possible place of origin: New Guinea/Indonesia
- Ancestor: S1a1 (Z42413)
- Descendants: S1a1b1 (M254)
- Defining mutations: M230, P202
- Highest frequencies: Ekari 74% (Mona 2007)

Haplogroup S-M230, also known as S1a1b (and previously as S* or K2b1a4), is a Y-chromosome DNA haplogroup. It is by far the most numerically significant subclade of Haplogroup S1a (and its sole primary subclade, Haplogroup S-P405).

S-M230 is commonly found among populations of the highlands of Papua New Guinea (Kayser 2003). It is also found at lower frequencies in adjacent parts of Indonesia and Melanesia. (Kayser 2003 Cox 2006)

== Origin ==
Haplogroup S-M230 is thought to have evolved somewhere between 28,000-41,000 years ago. Portions of Northern Melanesia were settled by modern humans at least 42,000 years before present; early populations of Melanesia were hunter-gatherers and introductions of plants and animals from New Guinea over the following millennia indicated continuing outside contact at a modest level0

== Distribution ==
One study has reported finding haplogroup S-M230 in: 52% (16/31) of a sample from the Papua New Guinea (PNG) Highlands; 21% (7/34) of a sample from the Moluccas; 16% (5/31) of a sample from the Papua New Guinea coast; 12.5% (2/16) of a sample of Tolai from New Britain; 10% (3/31) of a sample from Nusa Tenggara, and; 2% (2/89) of a sample from the West New Guinea lowlands/coast.(Kayser 2003 Cox 2006)

One subclade, Haplogroup S-M226.1 (S1a1b1d1a; previously S1d) has been found at low frequencies in the Admiralty Islands and along the coast of mainland PNG. (Kayser 2008).

== Phylogenetics ==
=== Structure & position within Haplogroup S ===
S1a

- S1a1 Z42413
  - S1a1a
    - S1a1a1 P60, P304, P308
    - S1a1a2
  - S1a1b M230, P202, P204 – "demoted" in 2016 from its previous position as the basal Haplogroup S* (and known before that as Haplogroup K5)
    - S1a1b1 (M254) (previously known as K2b1a4a)
    - S1a1b1 (M254)
      - S1a1b1a (P57)
      - S1a1b1b (P61)
      - S1a1b1c (P83)
      - S1a1b1d (SK1891)
- S1a2 P79, P307
- S1a3 P315
  - S1a3a Z41763
  - S1a3b~ P401

(Based on the 2017 ISOGG tree, the 2015 ISOGG tree,) the 2008 YCC tree (Karafet 2008) and other published research.)

=== History ===
Prior to 2002, there were in academic literature at least seven naming systems for the Y-Chromosome Phylogenetic tree. This led to considerable confusion. In 2002, the major research groups came together and formed the Y-Chromosome Consortium (YCC). They published a joint paper that created a single new tree that all agreed to use. Later, a group of citizen scientists with an interest in population genetics and genetic genealogy formed a working group to create an amateur tree aiming at being above all timely. The table below brings together all of these works at the point of the landmark 2002 YCC Tree. This allows a researcher reviewing older published literature to quickly move between nomenclatures.

YCC 2002/2008 (Shorthand)	(α)	(β)	(γ)	(δ)	(ε)	(ζ)	(η)	YCC 2002 (Longhand)	YCC 2005 (Longhand)	YCC 2008 (Longhand)	YCC 2010r (Longhand)	ISOGG 2006	ISOGG 2007	ISOGG 2008	ISOGG 2009	ISOGG 2010	ISOGG 2011	ISOGG 2012
K-M9	26	VIII	1U	25	Eu16	H5	F	K*	K	K	K	-	-	-	-	-	-	-

==== Research publications ====
The following research teams per their publications were represented in the creation of the YCC tree.

- α Jobling and Tyler-Smith 2000 and Kaladjieva 2001
- β Underhill 2000
- γ Hammer 2001
- δ Karafet 2001
- ε Semino 2000
- ζ Su 1999
- η Capelli 2001

==== 2008 YCC tree ====
From 2002 to 2008, it was known as Haplogroup K5, before that designation was superseded when Karafet et al. (2008) reorganised Haplogroup K and elevated K5 to become the new major Haplogroup S.

== See also ==
=== Genetics ===
- Genetic genealogy
- Haplogroup
- Haplotype
- Human Y-chromosome DNA haplogroup
- Molecular phylogenetics
- Paragroup
- Subclade
- Y-chromosome haplogroups in populations of the world
- Y-DNA haplogroups by ethnic group
- Y-DNA haplogroups in populations of East and Southeast Asia

=== Y-DNA S subclades ===
- S-M230
