= Dayak Basap =

Indigenous people of East Kalimantan, Indonesia

Regions with significant populations
- Borneo
- Indonesia (East Kalimantan, North Kalimantan): n/a

Languages
- Basap language, Indonesian language

Religion
- Christianity, Kaharingan

The Dayak Basap are an indigenous Dayak people of East Kalimantan, Indonesia. They are associated with communities living around the Sangkulirang-Mangkalihat Karst region and speak varieties of the Basap language.

Before the modern era, the Dayak Basap were often hunter-gatherers or horticulturalists. Their culture, settlement patterns and historical identity are connected with the wider Dayak populations of eastern Borneo.

== Population genetics ==
Genetic studies of related populations from eastern Borneo and Island Southeast Asia indicate a complex ancestry history involving Austronesian-related, Mainland Southeast Asian and Papuan-related components.

In one study of Island Southeast Asian populations, a small male sample associated with this population showed several Y-DNA haplogroups, including C*, K*, K2, O1b1a1a1a1a, O1a2 and O2a1b~.

The same study also reported several Mitochondrial DNA haplogroups in a small sample, including B4a, B5a, M20, M71a2, R9b1a1a and E1a.
