= Kerei =

Kazakh tribe that originated in the Altay region

Kerei is a Kazakh tribe that originated in the Altay region and fled into modern-day Kazakhstan in the early 13th century after being defeated by Genghis Khan.

== Origins ==
In historical literature, the prevailing view is that the Kazakh clan Kerei is descended from the Keraites of Wang Khan, who lived in Mongolia in the 13th century and fought against Genghis Khan. Most researchers have supported this interpretation. However, Grumm-Grzhimailo questioned the ethnic connection between the Kerei and the Keraites, noting that Chinese written sources use completely different characters to transcribe these two ethnonyms.

== See also ==
- Qarai Turks
- Kazakhs
