= Haplogroup C-F3393 =

Human Y-chromosome DNA haplogroup

Haplogroup C1 F3393
- Possible time of origin: about 49,200 years ago, 54,600 years ago,
- Possible place of origin: Asia
- Ancestor: Haplogroup C
- Descendants: C1a CTS11043 (C1a1 M8; C1a2 (previously C6) V20); C1b1a B66/Z16458; C1b1a1 M356 (previously C5); C1b2 C-B477 (C1b2a M38 (previously C2); C1b2a1a P33; C1b2b (previously C4) M347)
- Defining mutations: F3393

Haplogroup C1 also known as C-F3393, is a major Y-chromosome haplogroup. It is one of two primary branches of the broader Haplogroup C, the other being C2 (also known as C-M217; the former Haplogroup C3).

The basal paragroup, C1* (C-F3393*), has not been found in samples from living or dead males.

Of the two primary branches, C1b is common in parts of Oceania and Asia. The other primary branch, C1a, is extremely rare worldwide and has been found mainly amongst individuals native to Japan or Europe and among Upper Paleolithic Europeans, with single cases known from Nepal and Jeju Island through academic studies and from an ethnic Armenian, an ethnic Kabyle, and an ethnic Han from Linghai through commercial testing.

== Distribution ==
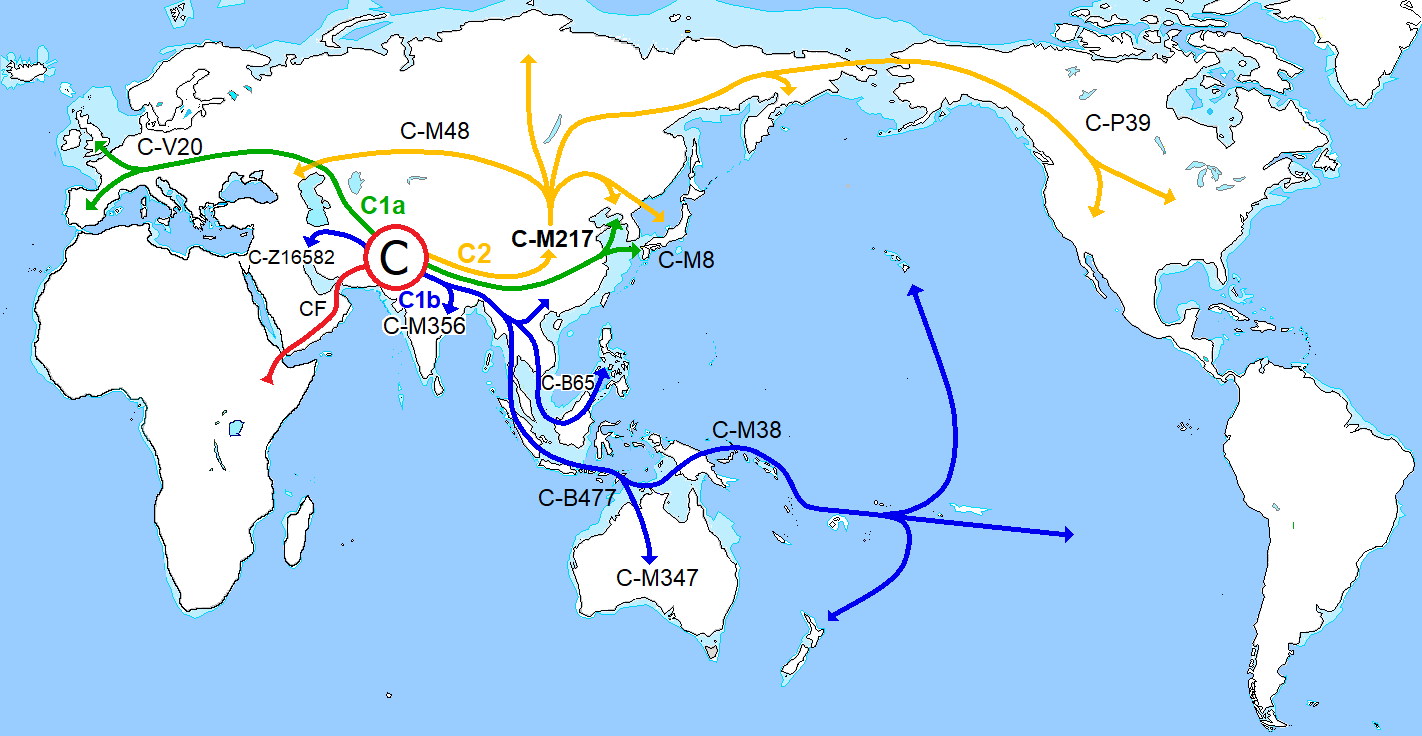
Migration of Haplogroup C (Y-DNA)

Subclades of C1 (C-F3393) are the predominant Y-DNA haplogroups among some Indigenous Australian peoples, some Pacific Islander peoples, and a few of the ethnic groups of the Lesser Sunda Islands of Indonesia. Other subclades are found, at very low frequencies, in isolated locations throughout the Eurasian landmass and adjoining islands.

=== C1a (CTS11043) ===
Basal C1a* (CTS11043) was found in an Upper Paleolithic Europeans (Aurignacians), GoyetQ116-1 and Pestera Muerii2.

Among the most interesting findings of recent genetic research is that living members of C1a are also rare and distributed geographically in an extremely bifurcated pattern.

C1a1 or C-M8 is now found regularly only with low frequency (approximately 5% to 6% of all samples) in Japan. It also has been found sporadically among thousands of males from Korea and hundreds of thousands of males from China who have had their Y-DNA tested.

C1a2 (known previously as C6) or C-V20 now appears to be found only among European, Algerian, Turks, Armenian, and Nepali males.

C1a2 was present in the remains in Europe by the Upper Paleolithic, including the Vestonice cluster (Vestonice16) (i.e. remains found in the modern Czech Republic). It was also found in the 7,000-year-old (Mesolithic) remains of a WHG (Western Hunter-Gatherers) known as "La Braña 1", found in La Braña-Arintero, León, Spain. La Braña 1 was part of the so-called Villabruna cluster, named after a site in northeast Italy. By the time of the Villabruna cluster, however, the dominant Y-DNA haplogroup in Western Europe was I2. (And the balance was again altered by the mass migrations into Europe of Neolithic Middle Eastern farmer and Bronze Age Indo-Europeans.) further: a male from the Great Hungarian Plain, approximately contemporaneous to the La Braña man also carried it, as did the 30,000-year-old remains of a Vestonice Cluster hunter-gatherer from the Pavlov-Dolní Věstonice area (Czech Republic), as well as a 34,000 years old Russian hunter gatherers from Sungir (Sunghir 1/2/3/4).

=== C1b (F1370) ===
Basal C1b* (F1370) has been identified in the remains of an individual known as Kostenki-14 who died circa 37,000 years BP (Upper Paleolithic) that was found at the Kostyonki archaeological site in western Russia. It has also been found in a small number of males from the Middle East.

C1b2 (C-B477) is the common ancestor of C-M38 and C-M347.

It is likely that more than 40% of Indigenous Australian males, before contact with European settlers, belonged to the subclade C1b2b (C-M347) known previously as C4. Within C-M347 at least two subclades have been identified: C1b2b1 (DYS390.1del,M210) and an as yet unresolved offshoot of the C1b2b1 paragroup (i.e. M347xDYS390.1del,M210).

C1b2a (M38), previously known as C2, is virtually restricted to Island South East Asia, New Guinea, Melanesia, and Polynesia. Of its subclades, C1b2a1a (P33) is found at a high frequency among Polynesians.

Some members of populations in parts of Asia have been found to carry Y-DNA that belongs to haplogroup C1b1-AM00694/K281. C1b1b-B68 has been found in a Dusun in Brunei. C1b1a-B66/Z16458 has three primary subclades: C1b1a1-M356, C1b1a2-B65, and C1b1a3-Z16582. C1b1a3-Z16582 has been found in some individuals from Saudi Arabia and Iraq. C1b1a2-B65 comprises two subclades, C1b1a2a-B67 and C1b1a2b-F725. C1b1a2a-B67 has been found in two Lebbo' people from Borneo, an individual from Hadakewa on Lembata, and four individuals from Flores (one from Rampasasa and three from Cibal). The TMRCA of C-B67 has been estimated to be 17,007 (95% CI 19,608 <-> 14,627) years before present, with the Lebbo' individuals from Borneo belonging to a branch that is basal to the rest. C1b1a2b-F725 has been found in Han Chinese in China (Guangdong, Hunan, and Shaanxi), Dai people in Yunnan, Murut people in Brunei, Malay people in Singapore, and Aeta people in the Philippines. C1b1a1-M356 has been found with overall low frequency in South Asia, Central Asia, and Southwest Asia.

== Phylogenetic structure ==
- C1 (F3393/Z1426)
  - C1a (CTS11043)
    - C1a1 (M8)
      - C1a1a (P121)
        - C1a1a1 (CTS9336)
          - C1a1a1a (Z7180)
            - C1a1a1a1 (CTS6678^)
          - C1a1a1b (Z1356)
            - C1a1a1b2 (Z40544)
    - C1a2 (V20)
      - C1a2a (V182)
        - C1a2a1 (V222)
          - C1a2a1a (Y12152/Z28813)
            - C1a2a1a1 (BY1117/Z31808)
              - C1a2a1a1a (Z31799)
            - C1a2a1a2 (Y12157/Z30466)
              - C1a2a1a2a (BY44466)
          - C1a2a1b (BY67541)
            - C1a2a1b1 (BY98578)
        - C1a2a2 (Y11325/Z29329)
      - C1a2b (Z38888)
        - C1a2b1 (BY22666/Z44467)
          - C1a2b1a (Z44576)
            - C1a2b1a1 (Y140262)
          - C1a2b1b (Z44526)
            - C1a2b1b1 (PH188.2)
            - C1a2b1b2 (F18203)
  - C1b (F1370)
    - C1b1 (AM00694/K281)
      - C1b1a (B66/Z16458)
        - C1b1a1 (SK991/Z16459)
          - C1b1a1a (M356)
            - C1b1a1a1 (P92)
              - C1b1a1a1a (Z5895)
                - C1b1a1a1a1 (K159)
                  - C1b1a1a1a1a (K96)
                    - C1b1a1a1a1a1 (K42)
                      - C1b1a1a1a1a1a (Z5896)
                        - C1b1a1a1a1a1a1 (K193)
                          - C1b1a1a1a1a1a1a (Z12522)
                            - C1b1a1a1a1a1a1a1 (K466)
                              - C1b1a1a1a1a1a1a1a (K470)
                                - C1b1a1a1a1a1a1a1a1 (Z5898)
            - C1b1a1a2 (Z5899)
              - C1b1a1a2a (Z12338)
                - C1b1a1a2a1 (Z5900)
                - C1b1a1a2a2 (SK994)
          - C1b1a1b (Z16582)
        - C1b1a2 (AM00847/AMM008/B65)
          - C1b1a2a (B67)
          - C1b1a2b (AM00594/Z33070)
            - C1b1a2b1 (AM00627/Z33098)
              - C1b1a2b1a (B465)
    - C1b2 (B477/Z31885)
      - C1b2a (M38)
        - C1b2a1 (M208)
          - C1b2a1b~
            - C1b2a1b1 (P54)
          - C1b2a1c (F21693)
            - C1b2a1c1 (B460)
              - C1b2a1c1b (B461)
            - C1b2a1c2 (FT12310^^)
              - C1b2a1c2a (B459)
              - C1b2a1c2b (FT12484)
                - C1b2a1c2b1 (FT13521)
                  - C1b2a1c2b1a (FT13115)
                - C1b2a1c2b2 (FT134718)
                  - C1b2a1c2b2a (FT133144)
                    - C1b2a1c2b2a1 (FT133627)
                - C1b2a1c2b3 (FT232409)
                  - C1b2a1c2b3a (FT245596)
        - C1b2a2 (FT71404)
          - C1b2a2b (F2642.3/S2169.3)
      - C1b2b (M347, P309)
        - C1b2b1 (M210)
