= Haplogroup C-M8 =

Human Y-chromosome DNA haplogroup

Haplogroup C-M8 (C1a1)
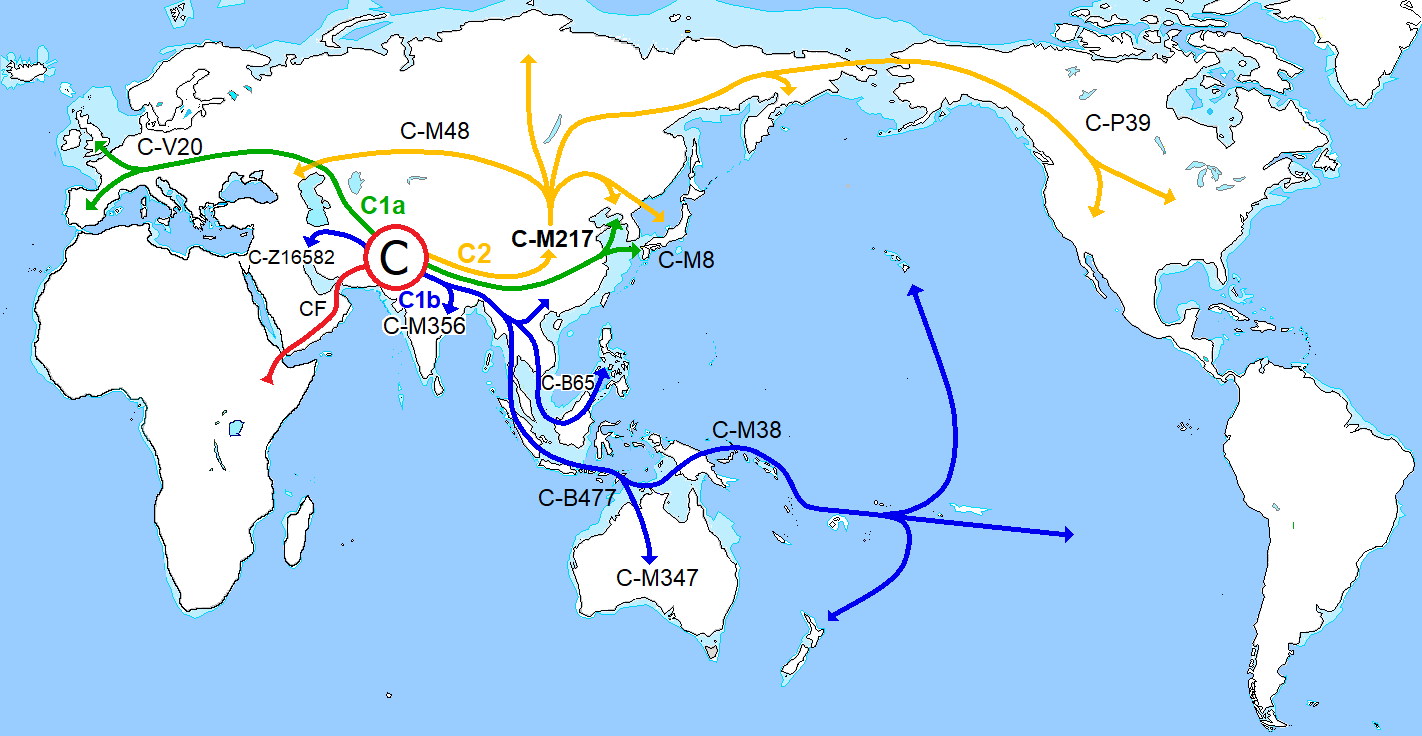
- Migration route of haplogroup C
- Possible time of origin: 41,900 YBP; 51,800 YBP
- Coalescence age: 11,650 YBP; 4,900 YBP
- Possible place of origin: Unknown
- Ancestor: (Grandparent) Haplogroup C1
- Defining mutations: M8, M105, M131, P122
- Highest frequencies: Japanese people, Ryukyuans

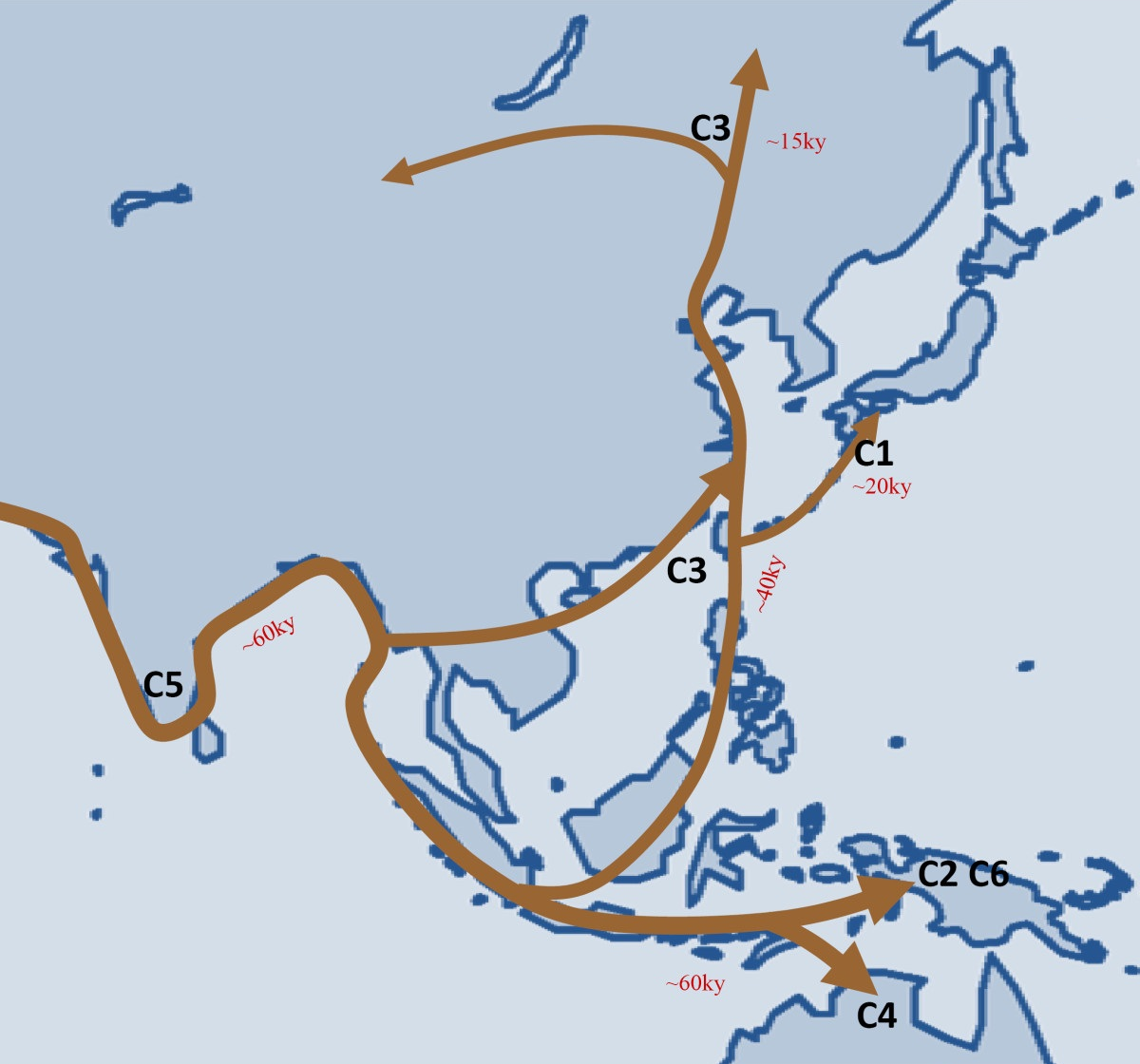
Likely migration route of haplogroup C in East Asia.

Haplogroup C-M8 also known as Haplogroup C1a1 is a Y-chromosome haplogroup. It is one of two branches of Haplogroup C1a, one of the descendants of Haplogroup C-M130.

It has been found in about 6% (2.3% to 16.7%) of modern males sampled in Japan and was traditionally considered to be a Y-DNA haplogroup descended from Jōmon people, though in recent years this assumption has been challenged, especially as all Y-DNA recovered from Jomon-period remains to date belongs to haplogroup D. In academic sources, it may have been observed in one individual in a sample collected from South Korea and in commercial testing in two individuals who have reported an origin in Liaoning province of China and four individuals who reported an origin in Korea.

The MRCA with its sister haplogroup C-V20 dates back to 40,000 to 50,000 years ago. Diffusion of existing subtypes of C-M8 is estimated to have begun about 12,000 years ago, though commercial YDNA testing has given more recent estimates.

== Frequency in Japan ==
Frequency in samples of Japanese from various regions:

- Okinawa 9.0% (4.4% - 16.7%)
- Kagawa? 8.5%
- Tokyo 7.1%
- Miyazaki 6.5% (0/29 = 0% Misato to 2/8 = 25% Aya, or 28/291 = 9.6% Western Miyazaki, 22/349 = 6.3% Northern Miyazaki, 27/488 = 5.5% Central Miyazaki, 6/141 = 4.3% Southern Miyazaki)
- Tokushima 6.3% (5.7% - 10.0%)
- Osaka 6.2%
- Fukuoka 5.9%
- Kawasaki 5.6%
- Shizuoka 4.9%
- Sapporo 4.1% (3.4% - 4.6%)
- Kanazawa 4.0% (3.4% - 4.7%)
- Aomori 3.8% (2.5% - 7.7%)
- Nagasaki 3.3%
- Saga 2.3%

== History ==
Haplogroup C1a1 (M8) is mostly unique to the Japanese archipelago, and its migration route is enigmatic.
