= Haplogroup C-V20 =

Haplogroup

- Possible place of origin: West Asia
- Ancestor: (Grandparent) C1
- Defining mutations: V20
- Highest frequencies: Very low frequency in Europe, North Africa, West Asia and South Asia

Haplogroup C-V20 (also known as Haplogroup C1a2) is a Y-chromosome haplogroup. It is one of two primary branches of Haplogroup C1a, one of the descendants of Haplogroup C1 (The other is C1a1 in Japan with an average amount of 5%). Haplogroup C-V20 is now distributed in Europe, North Africa, West Asia, and South Asia with very low frequency.

== History and Distribution ==
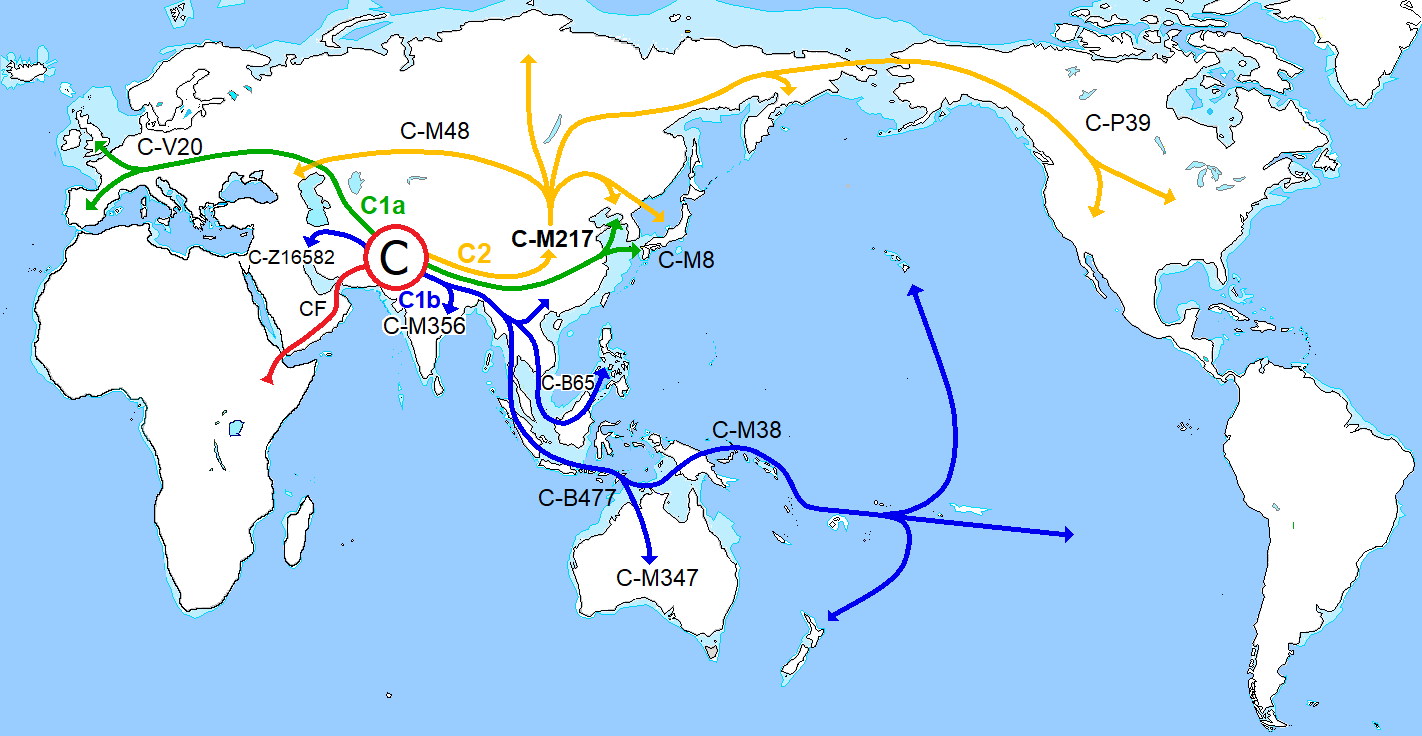
Migration of Haplogroup C (Y-DNA)

This animation shows the spread of anatomically modern humans throughout Eurasia and Africa during the Upper Paleolithic period, by Currat & Excoffier (2004). This corresponds with the spread of Haplogroups C1, among others.

Haplogroup C1a2 (V20) has been discovered in the remains of Palaeolithic people in Czech Republic (30,000 years ago), Belgium (35,000 years ago), and the Sunghir archaeological site near Vladimir, Russia. Regarding more recent prehistory, Haplogroup C-V20 has been found in the remains of a male (died ca. 7,000 years ago) associated with a late group of the Alföld Linear Pottery culture at Kompolt-Kigyósér, Hungary whose mtDNA belonged to haplogroup J1c1, the remains of a male (died ca. 7,000 years ago) associated with the LBK Culture at Apc-Berekalja (I.), Hungary whose mtDNA belonged to haplogroup K1a3a3, and the remains of a male (died ca. 7,000 years ago) associated with Mesolithic culture at La Braña-Arintero, León, Spain whose mtDNA belonged to haplogroup U5b2c1. It has also been found in ancient DNA from Anatolia, specifically in the remains of an Anatolian hunter-gatherers dating from 13.642-13.073 BCE and belonging to mitochondrial haplogroup K2b.

Haplogroup C-V20 Y-DNA also has been found in a very small number of modern Europeans, Algerians, Armenians, Turks and Nepalis. It includes many Y-DNA samples associated with the oldest currently known population of anatomically modern humans in Europe (Cro-Magnons), and it is considered to be a carrier of the Upper Paleolithic Aurignacian culture that began 40,000 years ago.
