= Haplogroup C-B477 =

Human Y-chromosome haplogroup

- Possible place of origin: Sahul Shelf
- Ancestor: C1
- Descendants: C1b2a-M38; C1b2b-M347
- Defining mutations: B477
- Highest frequencies: Papuan people, Indigenous Australians, Melanesian people, Polynesian people

Haplogroup C-B477, also known as Haplogroup C1b2, is a Y-chromosome haplogroup. It is one of two primary branches of Haplogroup C1b, one of the descendants of Haplogroup C1. Previously, this haplogroup was called C4 (C-M347).

It is distributed in high frequency in Indigenous Australians, Papuan people, Melanesian people, and Polynesian people.

== Phylogenetic structure ==
- C1b2 (B477/Z31885)
  - C1b2a (M38) Papuan people and other Oceanians
    - C1b2a1 (M208)
      - C1b2a1b~
        - C1b2a1b1 (P54)
      - C1b2a1c (F21693)
        - C1b2a1c1 (B460)
          - C1b2a1c1b (B461)
        - C1b2a1c2 (FT12310^^)
          - C1b2a1c2a (B459)
          - C1b2a1c2b (FT12484)
            - C1b2a1c2b1 (FT13521)
              - C1b2a1c2b1a (FT13115)
            - C1b2a1c2b2 (FT134718)
              - C1b2a1c2b2a (FT133144)
                - C1b2a1c2b2a1 (FT133627)
            - C1b2a1c2b3 (FT232409)
              - C1b2a1c2b3a (FT245596)
    - C1b2a2 (FT71404)
      - C1b2a2b (F2642.3/S2169.3)
  - C1b2b (M347, P309) Indigenous Australians
    - C1b2b1 (M210)

== Frequency ==
=== C-M38 ===
- Lani 100%,
- Dani 92%,
- Cook Islands 78%-82%,
- Samoa 62%-72%,
- Tahiti 64%,
- Sumba 57%,
- Maori 43%,
- Tonga 34%,
- Futuna 30%,
- Maewo 23%,
- Maluku Islands 15%-28%,
- Fiji 22%,
- Asmat people 20%,
- Coastal New Guinea 14%-23%,
- Flores 17%,
- Tuvalu 17%,
- Tolai 12.5%-21%,
- Lesser Sunda Islands 16%,
- Admiralty Islands 16%,
- West Sulawesi 12.5%

=== C-M347 ===
- Indigenous Australians 60.2%-68.7%

== Migration history ==
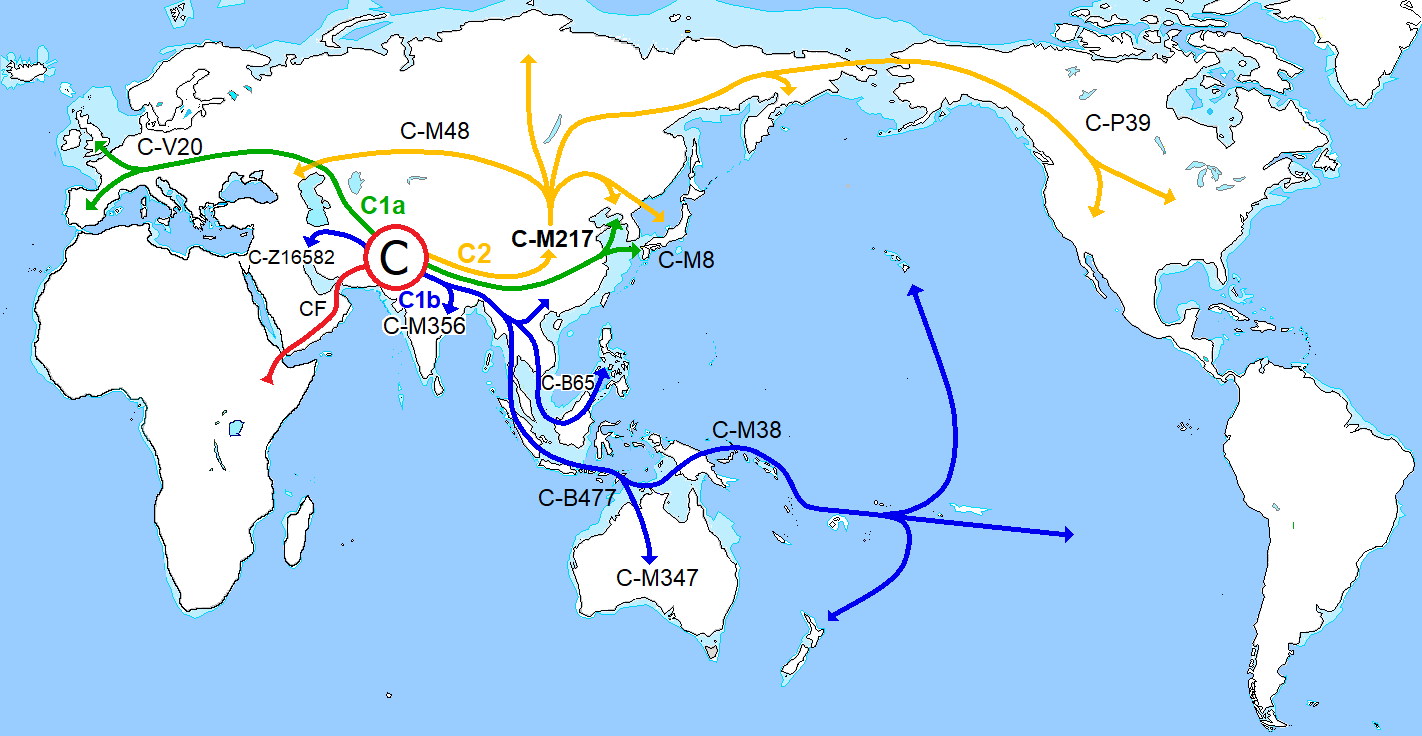
Migration of Haplogroup C (Y-DNA)

Haplogroup C-B477 took a southern route, after the Out of Africa expansion, through the Indian subcontinent to the Sahul Shelf. The C-M38 lineage is estimated to have diverged around 49,600 years ago, most likely around New Guinea.
