= Ethnic groups in East Asia =

People of East Asia

East Asian people (also East Asians) comprise a wide variety of ethnic groups from East Asia, which includes China, Japan, Mongolia, North Korea, South Korea, and Taiwan. The total population of all countries within this region is estimated to be 1.677 billion and 21% of the world's population in 2020. However, large East Asian diasporas, such as the Chinese, Japanese, Korean, Mongolian, and Taiwanese, as well as diasporas of other East Asian ethnic groups, mean that the 1.677 billion does not necessarily represent an accurate figure for the number of East Asian people worldwide.

The major ethnic groups (Note: There are no universally accepted and precise definitions of the terms "ethnic group" and "nationality". In the context of East Asian ethnography in particular, the terms ethnic group, people, nationality and ethno-linguistic group, are mostly used interchangeably, although preference may vary in usage with respect to the situation specific to the individual core countries of traditional East Asia.) that form the core of traditional East Asia are the Han Chinese, Koreans, and Yamato. Other ethnic groups of East Asia include the Miao, Ainu, Bai, Daur, Manchus, Mongols, Qiang, Ryukyuans, and Tibetans.

== Culture ==
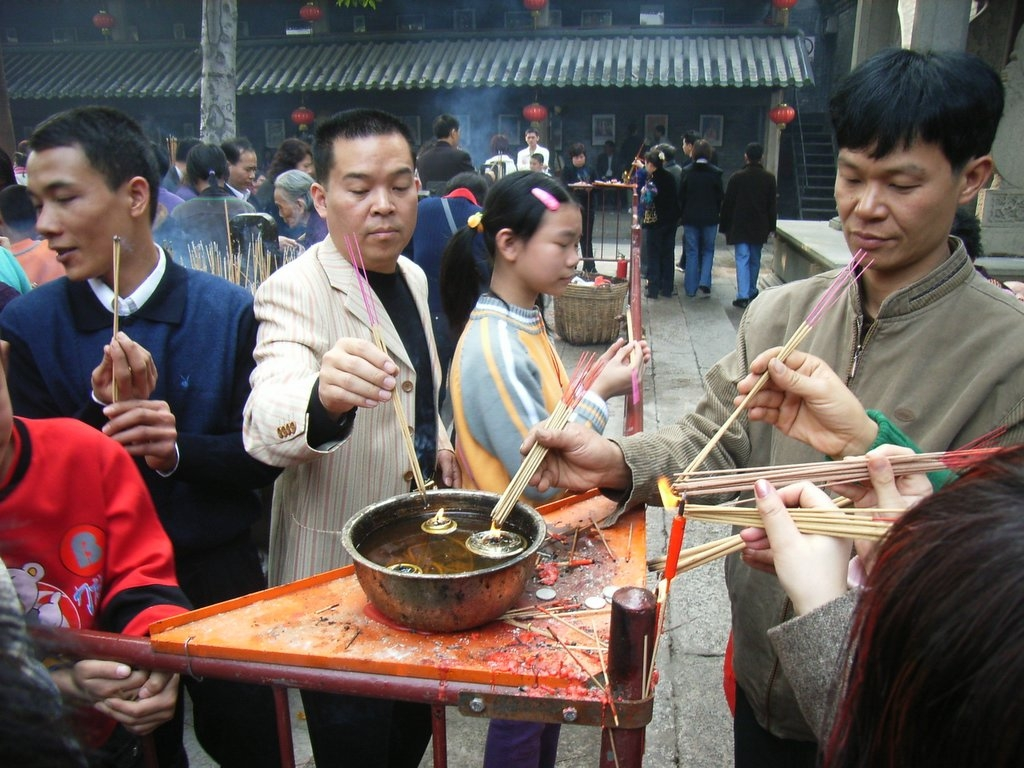
Chinese people in the Taoist temple in Foshan

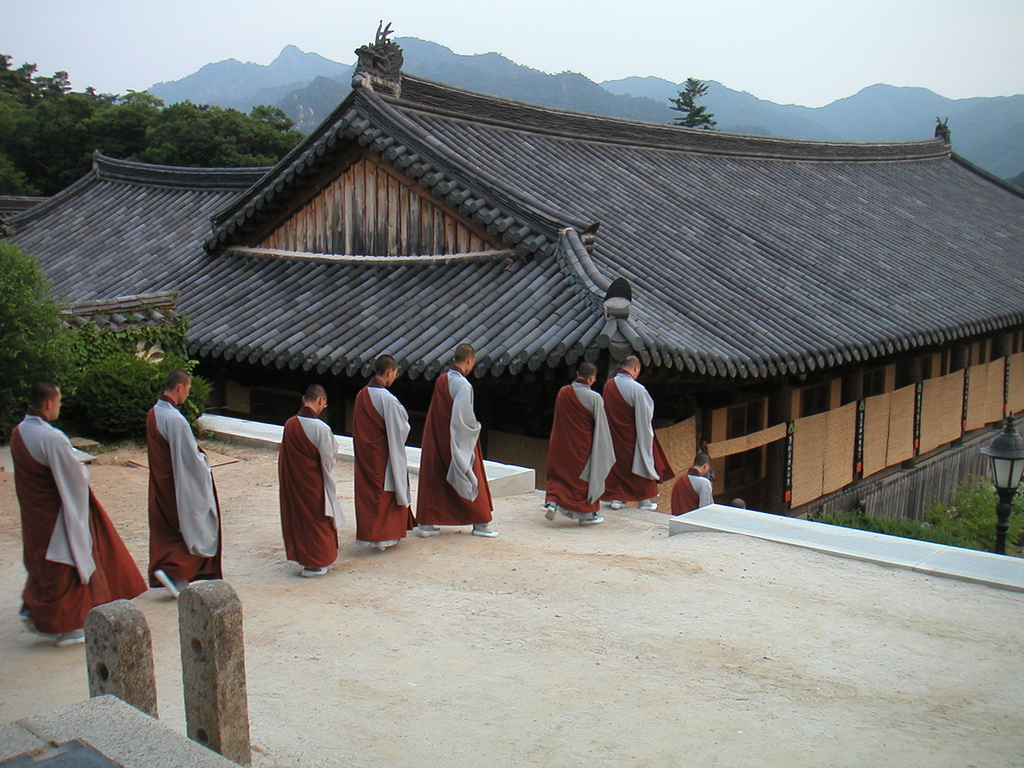
Korean Buddhist monks going down to their rooms after evening prayers at Haeinsa

The major East Asian language families that form the traditional linguistic core of East Asia are the Sinitic, (Note: Sinitic refers to Sinophones or Chinese-speaking ethnic groups. It is derived from the Greco-Latin word Sīnai ('the Chinese'), probably from Arabic Ṣīn ('China'), from the Chinese dynastic name Qín. (OED)) Japonic, and Koreanic families. Other language families include the Tibeto-Burman, Ainu languages, Mongolic, Tungusic, Turkic, Hmong-Mien, Tai–Kadai, Austronesian, and Austroasiatic.

Throughout the ages, the greatest influence on East Asia historically has been from China, where the span of its cultural influence is generally known as the Sinosphere laid the foundation for East Asian civilization. Chinese culture not only served as the foundation for its own society and civilization, but for also that of its East Asian neighbors, Japan and Korea. The knowledge and ingenuity of Chinese civilization and the classics of Chinese literature and culture were seen as the foundations for a civilized life in East Asia. China served as a vehicle through which the adoption of Confucian ethical philosophy, Chinese calendar systems, political and legal systems, architectural style, diet, terminology, institutions, religious beliefs, imperial examinations that emphasized a knowledge of Chinese classics, political philosophy and culture, as well as historically sharing a common writing system reflected in the histories of Japan and Korea. The relationship between China and its cultural influence on East Asia has been compared to the historical influence of Greco-Roman civilization on Europe and the Western World. Major characteristics exported by China towards Japan and Korea include shared vocabulary based on Chinese script, as well as similar social and moral philosophies derived from Confucianist thought.

Han characters and Written Chinese became the fundamental linguistic basis as well as the unifying linguistic feature in East Asian writing system as the vehicle for exporting Chinese culture to its East Asian neighbors. Chinese characters became the unifying language of bureaucratic politics and religious expression in East Asia. The Chinese script was passed on first to Korea and then to Japan, where Han characters acted as the major underlying fundamental linguistic basis constituent of the Japanese writing system. In Korea, however, Sejong the Great invented the hangul alphabet, which has since been used as the fundamental linguistic basis for formulating the Korean language. In Japan, much of the Japanese language is written in hiragana, katakana in addition to Chinese characters. In Mongolia, the script used there is the Cyrillic script along with the Mongolian script system.

== Genetics ==
East Asian populations descend from a single southern dispersal route into Eastern Asia via Southeast Asia at roughly 40,000 years ago. This demographic wave, dubbed as the 'East- and Southeast Asian lineage' (ESEA), is also broadly ancestral to present-day Southeast Asians, Polynesians, and Siberians, as well as the ancient Hoabinhian hunter-gatherers, and the c. 39,000 year old Tianyuan specimen from Northern China. The ESEA lineage trifurcated from the "East Eurasian Core" (EEC), the primary branch of Ancient East Eurasians, also known as "eastern non-Africans" (ENA), which also gave rise to the 'Ancient Ancestral South Indian' (AASI) and 'Australasian' populations.

In terms of Paleolithic ancestries, Eastern Asian populations can be modeled to derive primarily from an Onge/Hoabinhian-like profile (c. 76–79%) with lower amounts of Tianyuan-like admixture (21–24%). The Tianyuan lineage itself can be modeled as an earlier merger between Onge-like ancestry (61%) and deeply diverged East Eurasian ancestry associated with the Initial Upper Paleolithic movements into Siberia (39%), which were distantly related to the IUP-affiliated Bacho Kiro cave remains.

The majority of East Asians have the ABCC11 gene (80-95%), which greatly reduces body odor and codes for dry-type earwax. It is believed that this reduction in body odor may be an adaptation to colder climates by ancient Northeast Asian ancestors, although this is not definitively proven.

The emergence of lighter skin among Eastern Asians can be traced back to the positive selection for the rs1800414-G allele thought to date back to the Late Palaeolithic period (c. 25–30 kya), following the northward migration of modern humans from South/Southeast Asia.

== See also ==
- Ethnic groups in Asia
- Oriental
