= Tianyuan man =

Hominin fossil from China

Location
- Tianyuan man and contemporary cultures c. 50,000~40,000

Tianyuan man (simplified Chinese: 田园洞人; traditional Chinese: 田園洞人; pinyin: Tiányuándòng Rén) is the remains of one of the earliest modern humans to inhabit East Asia. In 2007, researchers found 34 bone fragments belonging to a single individual at the Tianyuan Cave near Beijing, China. Radiocarbon dating shows the bones to be between 42,000 and 39,000 years old, which may be slightly younger than the only other finds of bones of a similar age at the Niah Caves in Sarawak.

Tianyuan man is one of the oldest known members of the East Eurasian lineage that gave rise to (among others) modern East and Southeast Asians, Siberians and Native Americans.

== Subsistence ==
Nothing is known directly about the material culture of this individual, since so far, no artefacts or other cultural remains have been found at the site. Isotope analysis suggests that a substantial part of his diet came from freshwater fish.

== Physical anthropology ==
=== Morphology ===
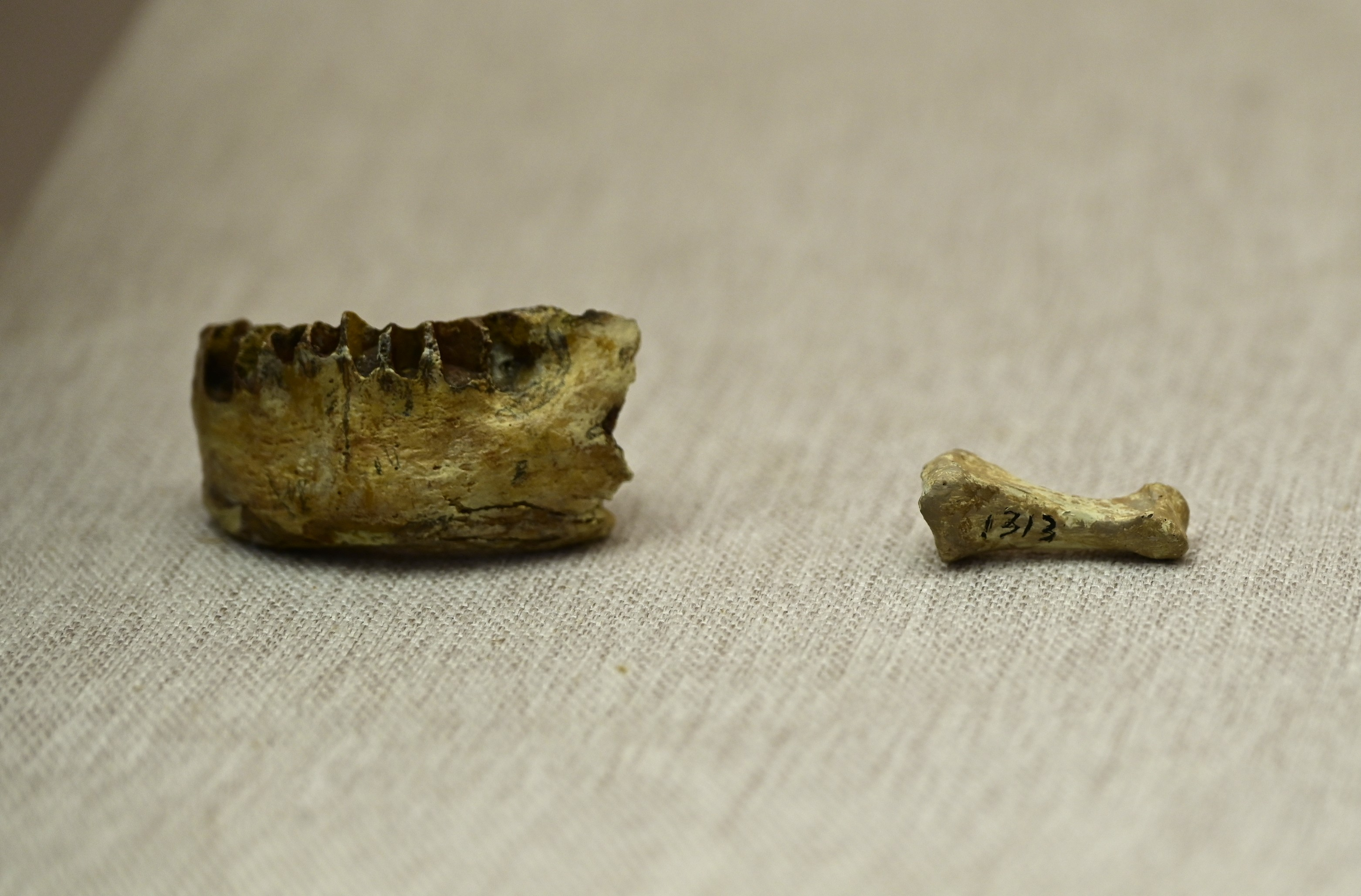
Casts of fossil material, Paleozoological Museum of China

Tianyuan man is considered to be early modern Homo sapiens. He lacks several mandibular features common among late archaic West Eurasian humans, showing his divergence. Based on the rate of dental occlusal attrition, he died in his 40s or 50s. The observed derived modern human features and the high crural index of Tianyuan 1, suggest "some relatively recent ancestry among more equatorial populations".

Like the Zhoukoudian remains from Beijing, the Tianyuan remains retained more "southern" morphological features associated with populations that initially colonized the Asia-Pacific region from the southern route.

=== Archaeogenetics ===
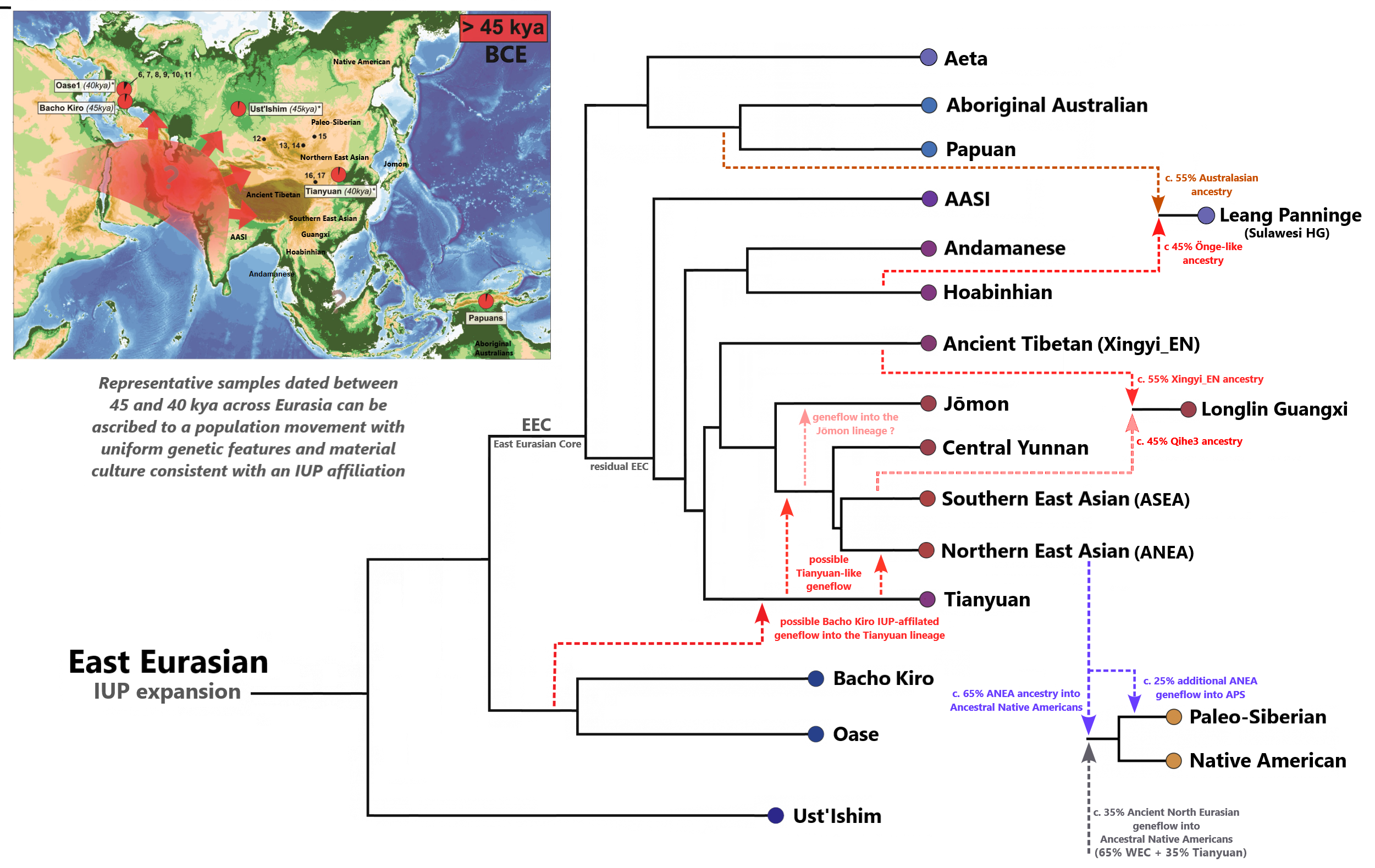
Phylogenetic position of the Tianyuan lineage among other East Eurasians.

The first DNA analysis of the Tianyuan remains (focusing on mtDNA and chromosome 21) was published in 2013 and revealed that Tianyuan man is related "to many present-day Asians and Native Americans" and had already diverged genetically from the ancestors of modern Europeans. He belonged to mitochondrial DNA haplogroup B, and paternal haplogroup K2b.

A genome-wide analysis confirmed the close affinity of Tianyuan man to modern East Asian and Southeast Asian populations as well as other Basal Asians such as Hoabinhians, Xingyi or Papuan lineages. It was also found that the Tianyuan lineage is not directly ancestral to modern populations, but rather represents a deeply diverged member of the East and Southeast Asian (ESEA) lineage, basal to all later populations of East and Southeast Asia. The Tianyuan man was determined to be part of an Initial Upper Paleolithic (IUP) wave, at least 45,000 years ago, "ascribed to a population movement with uniform genetic features and material culture" (Ancient East Eurasians), and sharing deep ancestry with other ancient specimens such as Bacho Kiro, Peștera cu Oase, the Ust'-Ishim man, as well as the ancestors of modern day Papuans (Australasians). The lineage ancestral to the Tianyuan man (dubbed as the "ESEA" lineage) is inferred to have diverged from the Ancient East Eurasians, following a Southern Route dispersal, and subsequently diverged into the Hoabinhian lineage, the Tianyuan lineage, and a lineage ancestral to all modern East and Southeast Asians. One study suggests that Tianyuan-related populations diverged from other East Eurasians after Papuans.

The Tianyuan lineage can be modeled as a Paleolithic admixture of an Onge-like source from Southeast Asia (c. 61%) and a deeply diverged East Eurasian source associated with the IUP movements into Siberia (c. 39%), which were distantly related to the Bacho Kiro Cave remains. An earlier model estimated around 64% ancestry related to Eastern Asians and 36% ancestry represented by the deeply diverged Ust'-Ishim man, who represents an "early leaf on the East Eurasian tree", close to a trifurication between West and East Eurasians. Alternatively, a 2023 study, when using ancient samples primarily from Europe and Siberia, the Tianyuan lineage can be modeled as a mixture of Sunghir-related lineages (c. 50%) and Bacho Kiro-related lineages (c. 50%), similar to Ust'-Ishim and GoyetQ116-1 lineages.^{(see supplemental material)}

The Tianyuan man exhibits unusually high genetic affinities with the West Eurasian GoyetQ116-1 individual from the Goyet Caves in Namur province, Belgium. The GoyetQ116-1 specimen is inferred to have 17–23% ancestry from an IUP-affiliated population distantly related to that one which also contributed to the Tianyuan man. This population is closely related to the Bacho Kiro Cave remains. Villalba-Mouco et al. (2023) argues that this IUP-affiliated population pre-dated the split between European and Asian populations. Another study suggests that the IUP-affiliated population was part of the earliest East Eurasian expansions in Eurasia and eventually, became distinct through additional admixture with archaic humans. However, it's also possible that Tianyuan man and GoyetQ116-1 derived their IUP ancestry from early related populations that lacked the additional Neanderthal ancestry found in IUP-affiliated remains in Bacho Kiro Cave.^{(see supplemental material)}

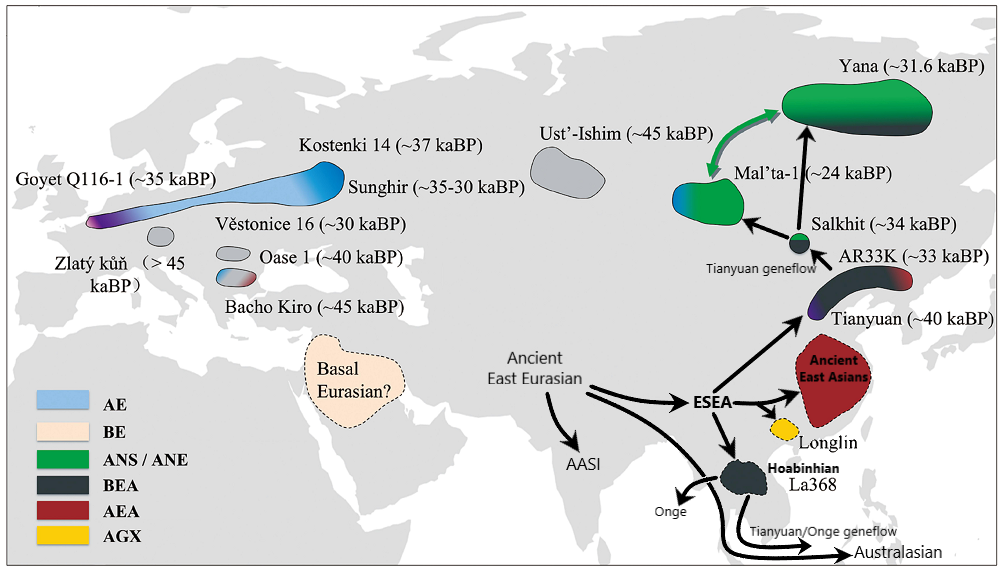
Ancestry related to the Tianyuan man is defined as Basal East Asian (BEA); ancestry related to Ancient East Asians (AEA); ancestry related to Ancient Northern East Asian (ANEA); ancestry related to Ancient Southern East Asian (ASEA); ancestry related to Ancient Guangxi population (Longlin/AGX).

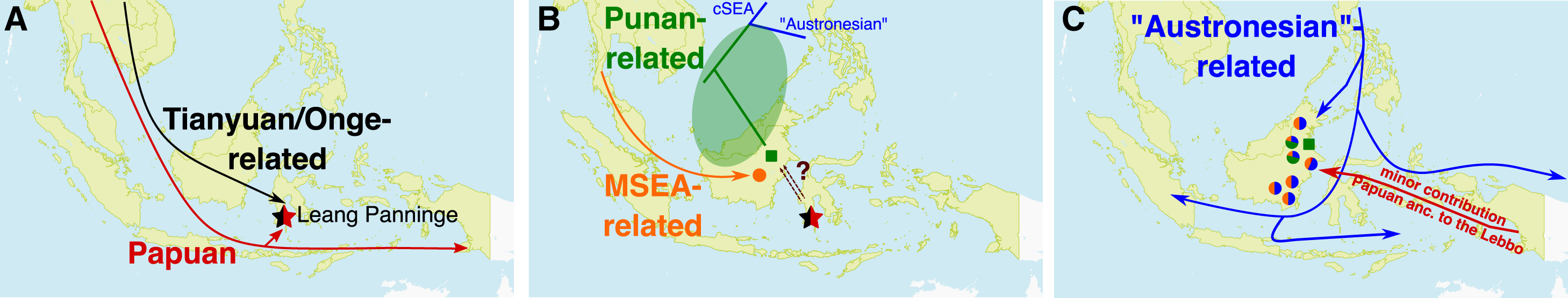
The initial peopling of Sundaland and the Sahul was carried out by ancestors of modern Papuan New Guineans and Australian Aboriginal populations, followed by deep mainland Asian (Tianyuan- or Onge-related) ancestry, preceding later expansions from Mainland Southeast Asia and Southern China.

The Tianyuan man also displays high genetic affinities with a 33,000-year-old specimen (AR33K), who lived between the Amur region and modern day Mongolia, suggesting that Tianyuan-like ancestry was widespread northeastern Asia during the Paleolithic period. This genetic cluster is also known as "Tianyuan cluster". The Tianyuan cluster was later replaced by Ancient Northern East Asian ancestry during the Last Glacial Maximum (19,000 to 26,000 years ago), evident by the Amur19k remains, although the exact circumstances remain inconclusive. The Amur19k remains were found to be basal to later Northern East Asian remains, and could already be distinguished from Ancient Southern East Asian remains.

The Tianyuan-related cluster lacked the derived variant of the EDAR gene allele, which was observed among the Amur19k individual and succeeding Northern East Asian remains. The allele was also absent from other East Eurasian populations, such as Papuans or the Jōmon people of Japan. A 2025 study states that the Tianyuan man had the highest Denisovan ancestry among East Eurasians.

==== Contributions to later populations ====
Ancient and modern East Asians derive most of their ancestry from an Onge-related population (76–79%), with additional gene flow from a Tianyuan-related population (21–24%). Around 22,000 to 26,000 years ago, the Tianyuan cluster was replaced by East Asian-like ancestry. According to a 2025 study, it is likely that the ancestors of ancient East Asians were a mixture of ancestries related to Tianyuan man and Early Neolithic Xingyi. Although the Hoabinhian, Early Neolithic Xingyi, and Tianyuan lineages were equally diverged from East Asians and each other, the Hoabinhian and Xingyi display some connections to East Asians, possibly due to more recent gene flow. Among modern Asians, the Tianyuan man is more related to Eastern Siberians than Southeast Asians, although East Asians and Siberians have relatively similar genetic affinities to the Tianyuan man as Eastern Siberians.

A Tianyuan-like population contributed around 29–50% ancestry to the Ancient North Eurasians, with the remainder being made up by Early West Eurasian ancestry represented by the Kostenki-14 specimen. A c. 34,000 year old specimen from Northern Mongolia (Salkhit) derives approximately 75% ancestry from a Tianyuan-like population, with the remainder (25%) being derived from a Yana-like population. The Salkhit individual displayed a complex bi-directional relationship to the Ancient North Eurasians. There is also evidence for low amounts (c. 2%) of Tianyuan-related geneflow into the Upper Paleolithic Sungir population of Western Russia, consistent with traces of Denisovan ancestry. Similarly, GoyetQ116-1 from western Europe shares excess affinity with both Tianyuan and the IUP-affiliated remains from Bacho Kiro Cave, although this is due to gene flow from the latter. While increased Tianyuan affinity among Eastern hunter-gatherers is explained by high Ancient North Eurasian ancestry, a similar affinity observed among Iberian hunter-gatherers (MLZ) is instead explained by high GoyetQ116-1 ancestry.

Basal East Asian or "Deep Asian" ancestry, represented by Tianyuan or Andamanese Onge, directly contributed to the peopling of Southeast Asia, following the establishment of deeply diverged Australasian ancestry and preceding Mesolithic and Neolithic expansions of Ancient Southern East Asians associated with the spread of Austroasiatic and Austronesian languages.

The Tianyuan man also shares more alleles with South American populations, such as the Surui and Karitiana in Brazil and Chane in northern Argentina and southern Bolivia, than with other indigenous Americans.

== See also ==
- Hoabinhian man
- Salkhit man
