= Peopling of Southeast Asia =

Prehistoric migrations

See Archaic humans in Southeast Asia for the earlier presence of archaic humans.

Southeast Asia was first reached by anatomically modern humans possibly before 70,000 years ago. Anatomically modern humans are suggested to have reached Southeast Asia twice in the course of the Southern Dispersal migrations during and after the formation of a distinct East Asian clade from 70,000 to 50,000 years ago.

== Archeological discoveries ==
In Asia, the most recent late archaic human fossils were found in Thailand (125,000–100,000 BP), the Philippines (58,000–24,000 BP), Malaysia (c. 40,000 BP), and Sri Lanka (c. 36,000 BP). The artifacts from these sites include partial skeleton, crania, deep skull, and other related skeletons indicate that modern human migrated to Asia earlier than the western theory might have discussed.

In 2007, an analysis of cut marks on two bovid bones found in Sangiran, showed them to have been made 1.5 to 1.6 million years ago by clamshell tools. This may be the oldest evidence for the presence of early humans in today Indonesia and are to date the oldest evidence of shell tool use in the world.

In 2009, archaeologists discovered the partial cranium and some teeth of a modern human at Tam Pa Ling in mainland Laos, which shed light on the understanding of anatomically modern human migration and evolution in the region during the Late Pleistocene Period. The site is located in Houaphanh Province, around 170 miles north of Vientiane, the capital city of modern Laos. Within this site, only human remains were found, and there is no evidence of human occupation or other artifacts. The radiocarbon dating of the charcoal and the sediment dating analyses identify the remains to date at least c. 56,500 BP, while the dental artifacts from the remains that analyzed by the isotope-ratio measurement indicate c. 63,600 BP. The analysis of the cranium and dentition of the remains suggest that these are the remains of early modern human populations in Southeast Asia. This date is older than the fossils that were found in Niah cave in Malaysia, which offers another explanation for human evolution in Southeast Asia.

In addition to the discovery in Laos, there are also a number of human remains and related artifacts found across mainland Southeast Asia in which it suggests the new ideas of the regional Late Pleistocene development as well. More teeth and molars that were found in Thailand and Vietnam sites (Tham Wihan Naki, Thailand; Tham Kuyean, Vietnam, etc.) indicate transitions between H. erectus and H. sapiens. In fact, these remains might indicate the possible interbreeding between H. erectus and H. sapiens, such as the tooth at Wihan Nakin at Chaiyaphum province in Thailand.

== Migrations ==
The earliest modern human inhabitants of Southeast Asia were hunter-gatherers that arrived in the area at least c. 40,000 BP. Contemporary remnant groups of these earliest inhabitants (e.g. the Semang of Malaysia or the Aetas of the Philippines) are usually included under the cover term "Negrito". The earliest settlers had sufficient maritime technology to cross the Wallace Line, probably at a similar date to the first settlement of Sahul (c. 45,000/49,000 – 43,000 BP). During the last glacial maximum, the sea level decreased and promoted human migrations that increased genetic admixture among Southeast Asian populations. There is also evidence that Southeast Asia, which was part of Sundaland at the time, was where Papuans, Negritos and East Asians split, implying a one-wave colonization of Asia by ancestral Asians after they split from Europeans.

The Neolithic was characterized by several early migrations from southern China into Mainland and Island Southeast Asia by Austroasiatic and Austronesian-speakers.

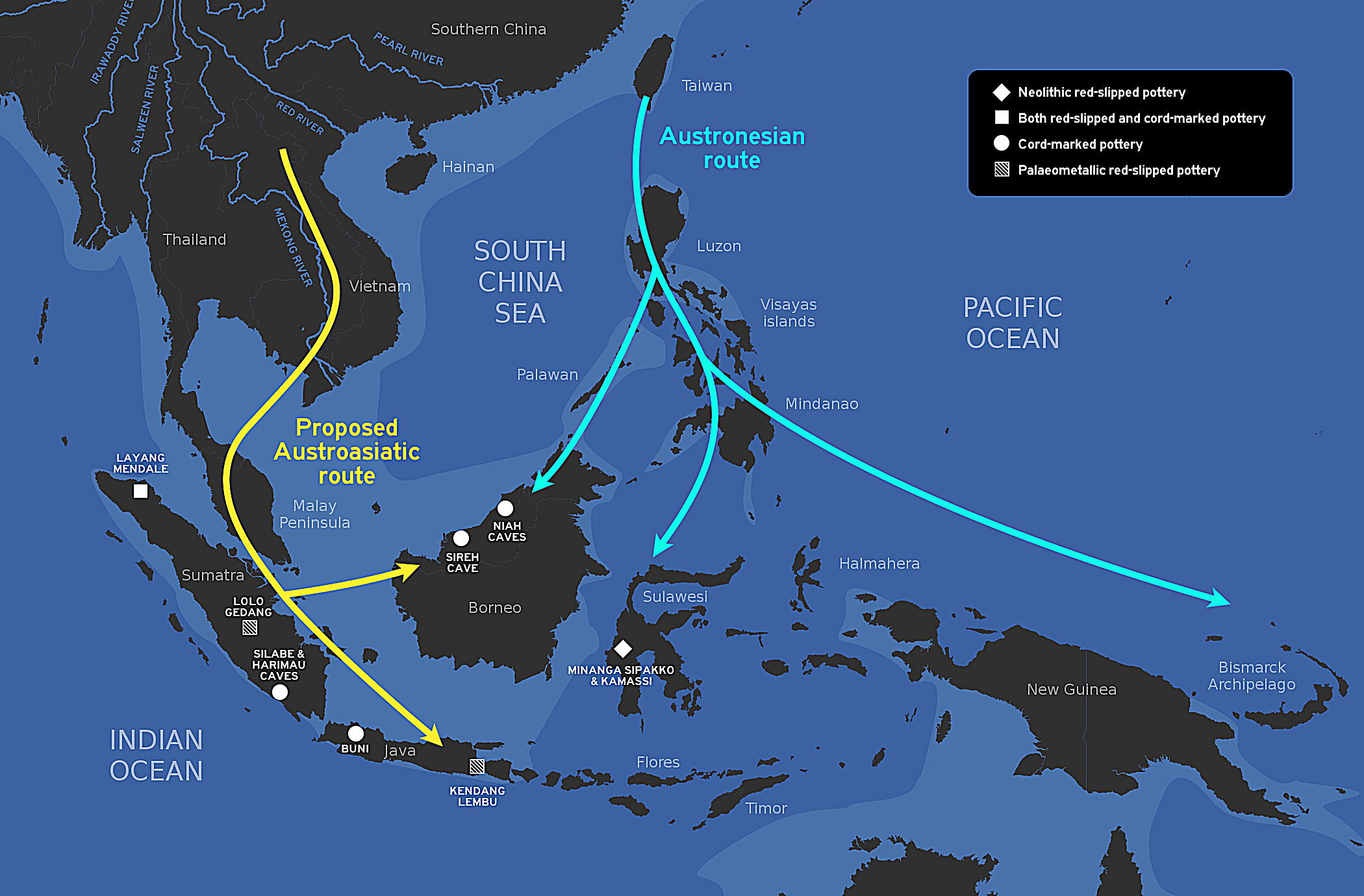
The proposed route of Austroasiatic and Austronesian migration into Insular Southeast Asia during the Neolithic period. (Simanjuntak, 2017)

These routes also allowed the early arrival to Philippines and have been formally evaluated through extensive genetic analyses. Therefore, during the Neolithic, Austroasiatic peoples populated Southeast Asia via a variety of land routes. The earliest agricultural societies that cultivated millet and wet-rice emerged around 1700 BCE in the lowlands and river floodplains of Southeast Asia. Based on archaeological and genetic evidence, it is assumed that Austroasiatic speakers also expanded into Insular Southeast Asia in the Neolithic, but were later supplanted or assimilated by Austronesian speakers.

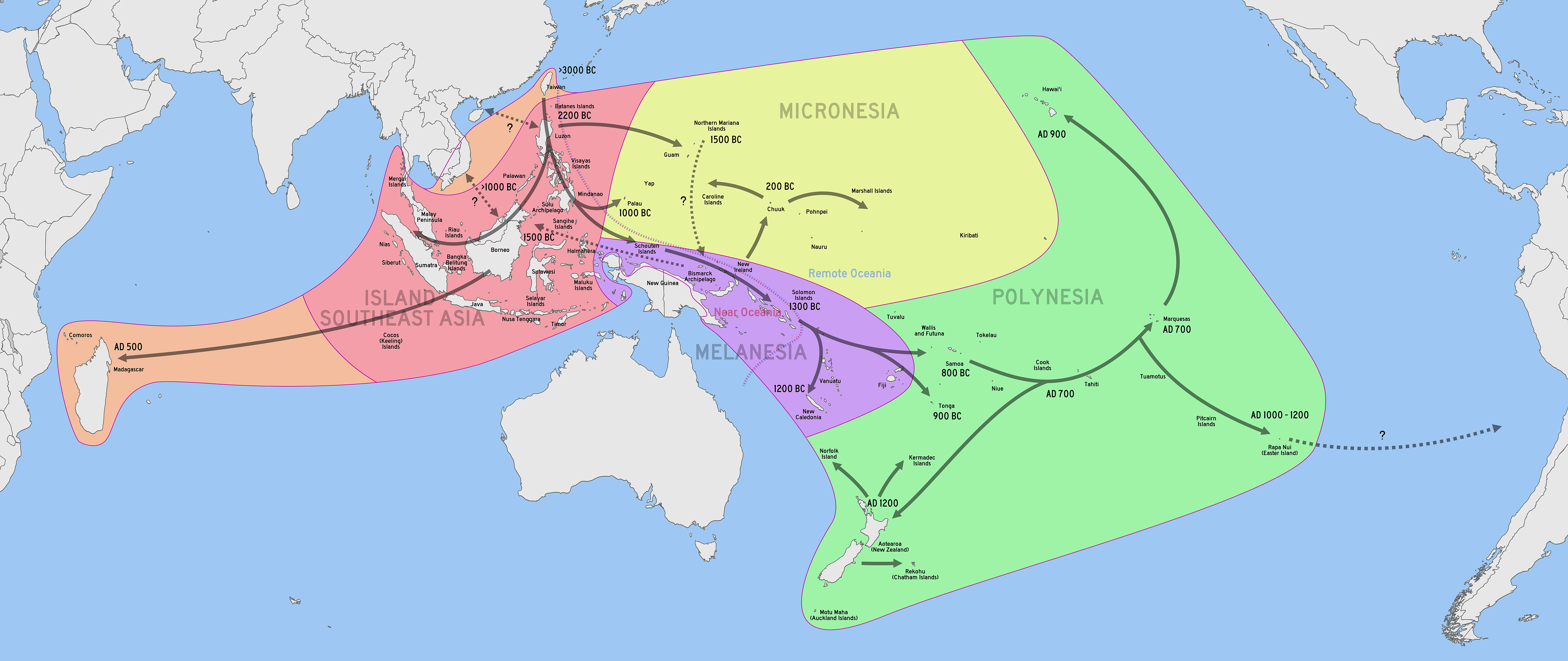
The Austronesian Expansion(3500 BCE to CE 1200)

The most widespread migration event was the Austronesian expansion, which began at around 5,500 BP (3500 BCE) from coastal southern China via Taiwan. Due to their use of ocean-going outrigger boats and voyaging catamarans, (Note: Different dates are argued for the introduction of the various pieces of maritime technology by Austronesians. These are based on linguistics and the distribution of types on first European encounter. There is no early archaeological evidence, and little iconographic or written evidence on this until the first encounters with Europeans) Austronesians rapidly colonized Island Southeast Asia, before spreading further into Micronesia, Melanesia, Polynesia, Madagascar (Note: c.7th century CE or later) and the Comoros. They dominated the lowlands and coasts of Island Southeast Asia, giving rise to modern Islander Southeast Asians, Micronesians, Polynesians, and Malagasy. The first Austronesians reached the Philippines at around 2200 BCE, settling the Batanes Islands and northern Luzon from Taiwan. From there, they rapidly spread downwards to the rest of the islands of the Philippines and Southeast Asia.

About 4,000 BP, Kra-Dai speakers from coastal southern China, around the Guangdong, Guangxi and Fujian provinces, migrated to the Guizhou, Yunnan, Hainan, and Mainland Southeast Asia due to environmental change and demographic changes. As they migrated, they interacted with local settlements built by Austroasiatic, Austronesian, Hmong-Mien and Tibeto-Burman speakers.

== Trade ==
Territorial principalities in both Insular and Mainland Southeast Asia, characterised as agrarian kingdoms had by around 500 BCE developed an economy based on surplus crop cultivation and moderate coastal trade of domestic natural products. Several states of the Malayan-Indonesian "thalassian" zone shared these characteristics with polities in Mainland Southeast Asia like the Pyu city-states in the Irrawaddy river valley, Van Lang in the Red River delta and Funan around the lower Mekong. Văn Lang, from at least the 7th century BCE endured until 258 BCE under the rule of the Hồng Bàng dynasty, as part of the Đông Sơn culture eventually sustained a dense and organised population, that produced an elaborate Bronze Age industry.

Intensive wet-rice cultivation in an ideal climate enabled the farming communities to produce a regular crop surplus, that was used by the ruling elite to raise, command and pay work forces for public construction and maintenance projects such as canals and fortifications. Though millet and rice cultivation was introduced around 2000 BCE, hunting and gathering remained an important aspect of food provision, in particular in forested and mountainous inland areas.

Historians have emphasized the maritime connectivity of the Southeast Asian region whereby it can be analyzed as a single cultural and economic unit, as has been done with the Mediterranean basin. This region stretches from the Yangtze River Delta in China down to the Malay Peninsula, including the South China Sea, Gulf of Thailand and Java Sea. The region was dominated by the thalassocratic cultures of the Austronesian peoples.

== Genetics ==
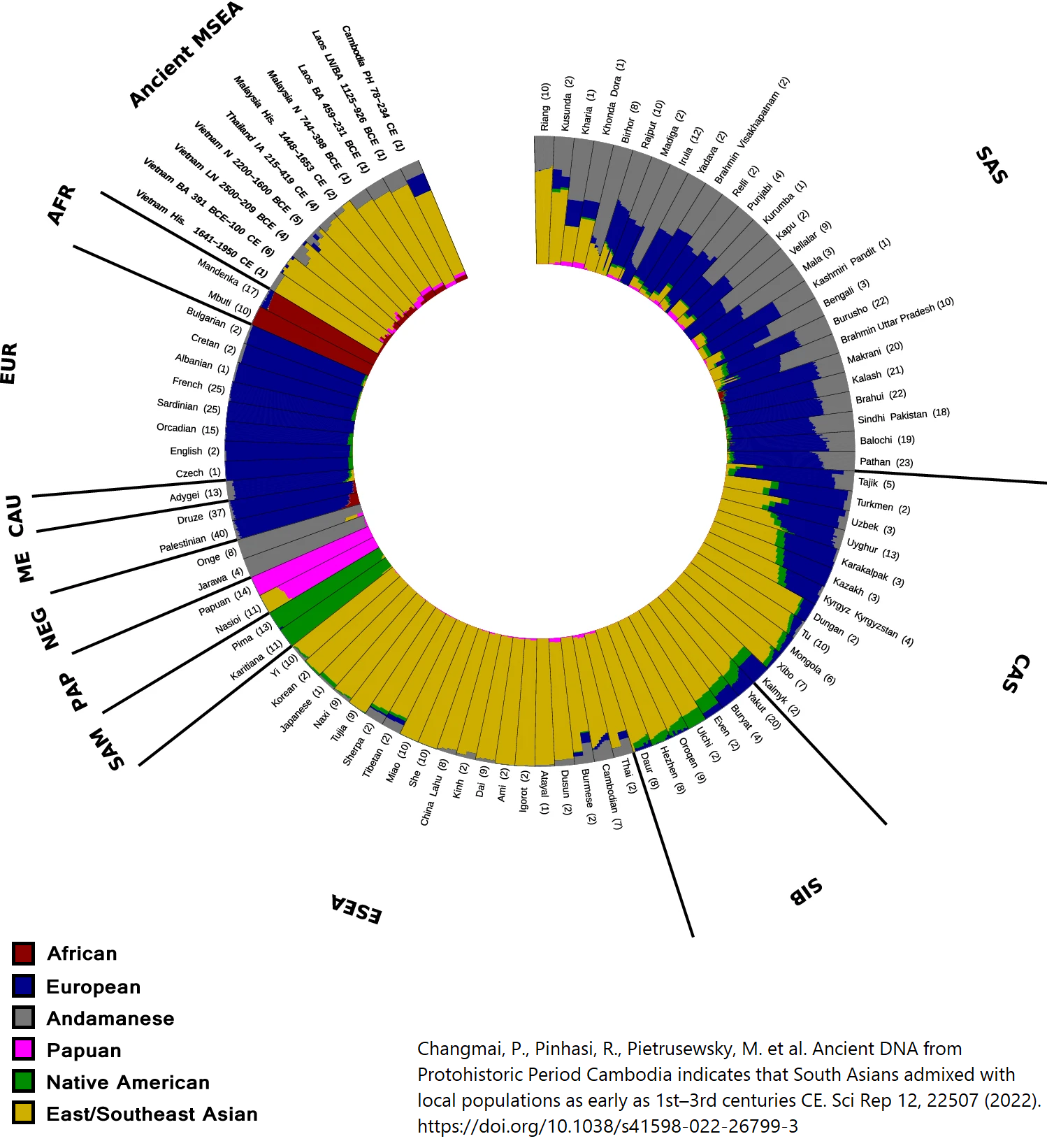
Estimated ancestry components among selected modern populations per Changmai et al (2022). The yellow component represents East Asian-like ancestry.

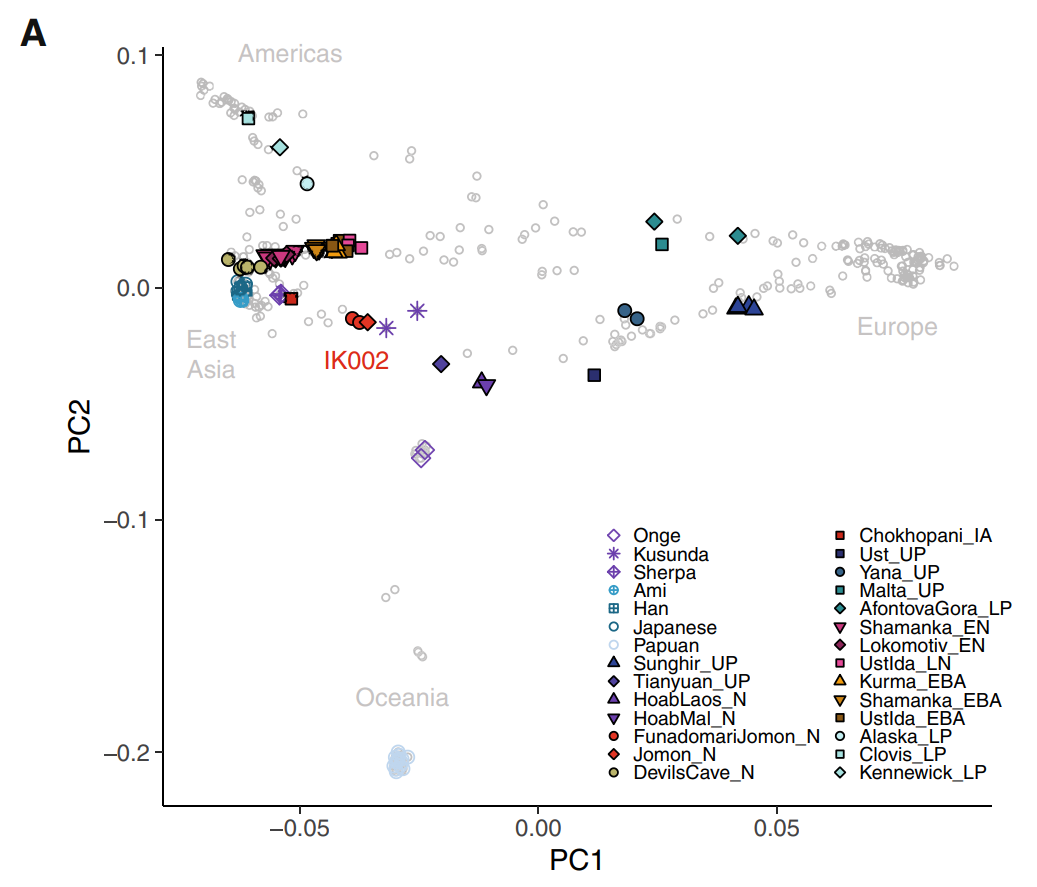
Principal component analysis (PCA) of ancient and present-day individuals from worldwide populations after the out-of-Africa expansion.

A 2015 study (Chaubey et al. 2015) found evidence for ancient gene flow from East Asian-related groups into the Andamanese people, suggesting that Andamanese (Onge) had about 30% East Asian-related ancestry next to their original Negrito ancestry, though the authors also suggest that this latter finding may in fact reflect the genetic affinity of the Andamanese to Melanesian, Southeast Asian, and Asian Negrito populations rather than true East Asian admixture (stating that the "Han ancestry measured in Andaman Negrito is probably partially capturing both Melanesian and Malaysian Negrito ancestry"), as a previous study by the authors (Chaubey et al. 2013) indicated "a deep shared ancestry" between the Andamanese, Melanesians and Southeast Asian Negrito groups, as well as their affinity to South Asians, Southeast Asians and East Asians.

A 2020 genetic study on Southeast Asian populations focusing on ethnic groups in Vietnam (Liu et al. 2020) found that most sampled groups are closely related to East Asians and carry mostly "East Asian-related" ancestry (proxied by Southern Chinese ethnic groups). Modern Austronesian and Austroasiatic speaking populations in Vietnam and Southern China were found to have mostly East Asian-related ancestry (89% to 96%, with 94% on average). Taiwanese indigenous peoples had on average 99% East Asian-related ancestry. Kra–Dai-speaking populations had, similar to the Taiwanese indigenous peoples, nearly exclusively East Asian-related ancestry.

A 2021 study about the ancestral composition of modern ethnic groups in the Philippines suggests that distinctive Basal-East Eurasian (Eastern non-African) ancestry originated in Mainland Southeast Asia at ~50,000 BCE, and expanded through multiple migration waves southwards and northwards respectively, giving rise to both Oceanian (Papuan related) and East Asian (Tianyuan and Onge related) lineages.

Another study from 2021 found that an ancient Holocene hunter-gatherer from South Sulawesi had ancestry from both the Oceanian lineage (modeled by Papuans and Aboriginal Australians) and from an East Asian lineage (modeled as Onge or Tianyuan related). The hunter-gatherer individual had approximately ~50% of this "Basal-East Asian" ancestry, and was positioned in between the Andamanese Onge and the Papuans of Oceania. The authors concluded that the presence of this ancestry in a Holocene forager suggests that East Asian-related admixture may have taken place long before the expansion of Austronesian societies into the region.

Genetic analyses state that Southeast Asia faced four prehistoric migratory waves, impacting present demographics. The first wave was initiated by mainland Hòabìnhians, hunter-gatherer populations who share the closest genetic affinities to present-day Andamanese Önge and Malaysian Jehai. Denisovan ancestry was absent in these populations, although the Mamanwa from the Philippines mixed with Denisovian-shifted Papuans. Other studies also suggest a genetic affinity between the Hòabìnhians and the Ikawazu Jōmon. About 4 kya, Neolithic farmers from East Asia expanded into Southeast Asia and introduced Austroasiatic ancestry, which peaks in the Mlabri and Htin, along with western Indonesians, especially Balinese and Javanese, Temuan and Jehai. By 2 kya, additional East Asian ancestry, related to present Asian groups such as Hmong, Dai, Kinh Vietnamese, Thai, etc., was introduced. Austronesian ancestry was also introduced into Indonesia and Philippines by 1.8 and 2.1 kya respectively. Possibly due to later cultural exchanges with India, some populations in Southeast Asia can be modeled to have some South Asian-related ancestry (best proxied by modern South Indian groups such as Irula or Mala) ranging from 2% to 16%. Exceptions were isolated hill tribes and present hunter-gatherer groups in Thailand. However, a 2026 study found that South Asian-related ancestry in Mainland Southeast Asia, can be dated back to the Neolithic period. This ancestry was described to be related to a deeply diverged lineage that's broadly related to South Asians, Southeast Asians and East Asians.

Ancient and modern East Asian populations can be modeled to derive primarily from an Onge-like profile (c. 76–79%) with lower amounts of Tianyuan-like admixture (21–24%). Southeast Asian populations fall along a cline between East Asian populations and additional Onge-like ancestry associated with local Hoabinhians. Ancestries related to Papuans and Jōmon peoples is also detected in Southeast Asian populations.

== See also ==
- Ancient East Eurasians
- Archaic humans in Southeast Asia
- Prehistoric Southeast Asia
- Models of migration to the Philippines
- Peopling of Thailand
- Austronesian expansion
- Genetic history of East Asians
- Genetic history of South Asians
- Genetic studies on Filipinos
- List of first human settlements
