= Ancient Paleo-Siberian =

Human archaeogenetic lineage

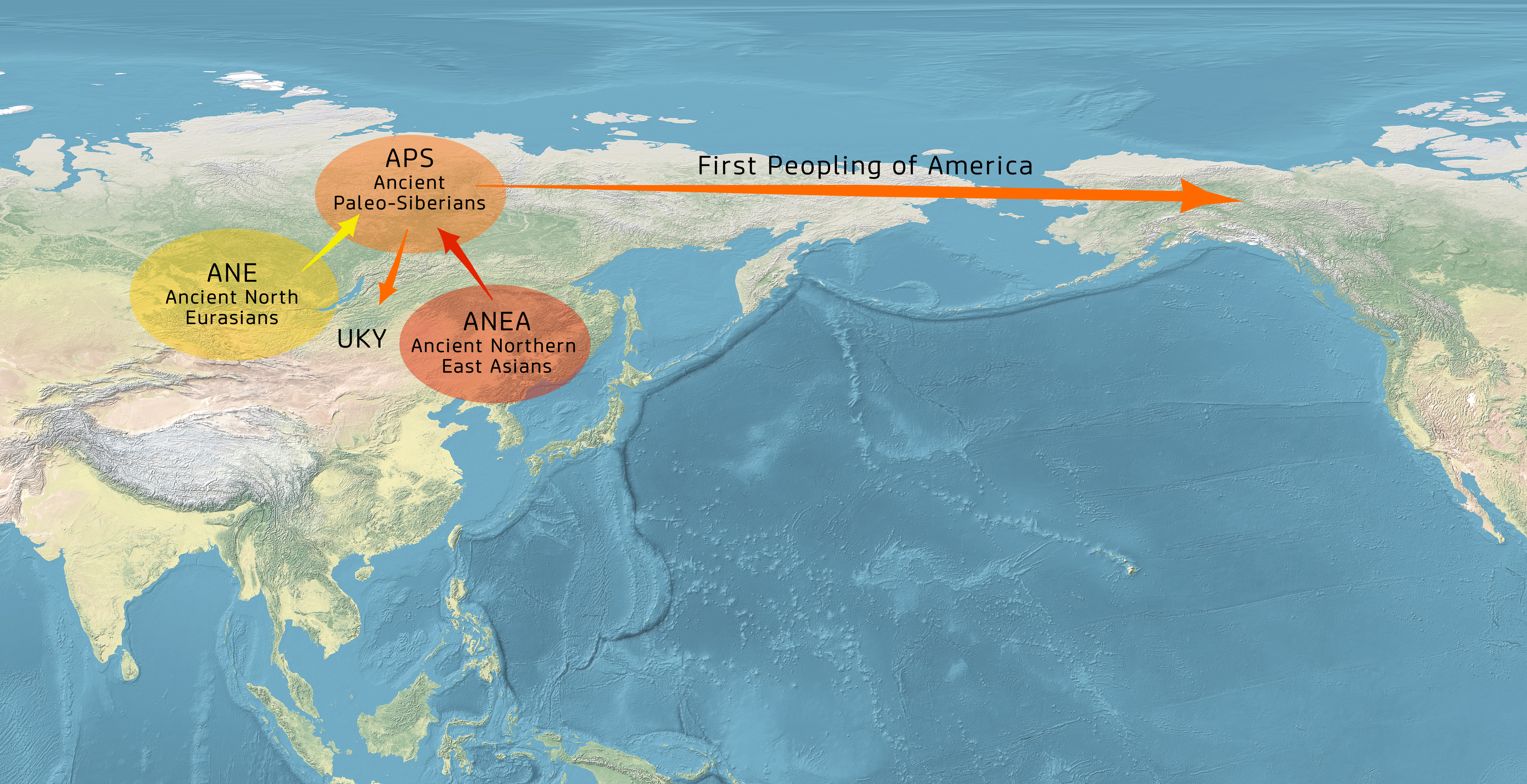
The Ancient Paleo-Siberians ( ) formed from the Ancient North Eurasians (ANE, ) and Ancient Northern East Asian ancestry (ANEA, ), and are closely connected to the first wave of humans into the Americas.

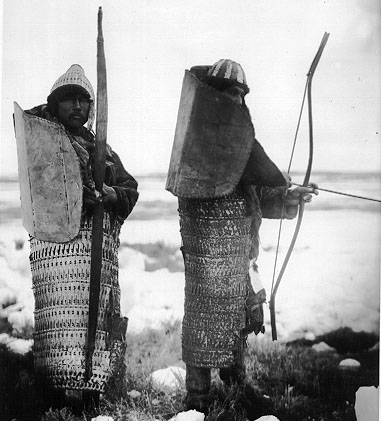
The Koryaks are closely related to the Ancient Paleo-Siberians.

In archaeogenetics, the term Ancient Paleo-Siberian is the name given to an ancestral component that represents the lineage of the hunter-gatherer people of the 15th–10th millennia before present, in northern and northeastern Siberia. The Ancient Paleo-Siberian population is thought to have arisen from an Ancient East Asian lineage, which diverged from other East Asian populations sometime between 26kya to 36kya, which later merged with Ancient North Eurasians (ANE) sometime between 20 kya to 25 kya. The ANE themselves are described as the "result of a palaeolithic admixture" between ancient West Eurasians and East Eurasians. The source for the East Asian component among Ancient Paleo-Siberians is to date best represented by the Ancient Northern East Asian individual AR14K from the Amur region. Other studies define Ancient Paleo-Siberians by their distinct mixture of ANE, Ancient Northeast Asian and first Native American-related ancestries, especially in the context of mainland Northeast Asia.

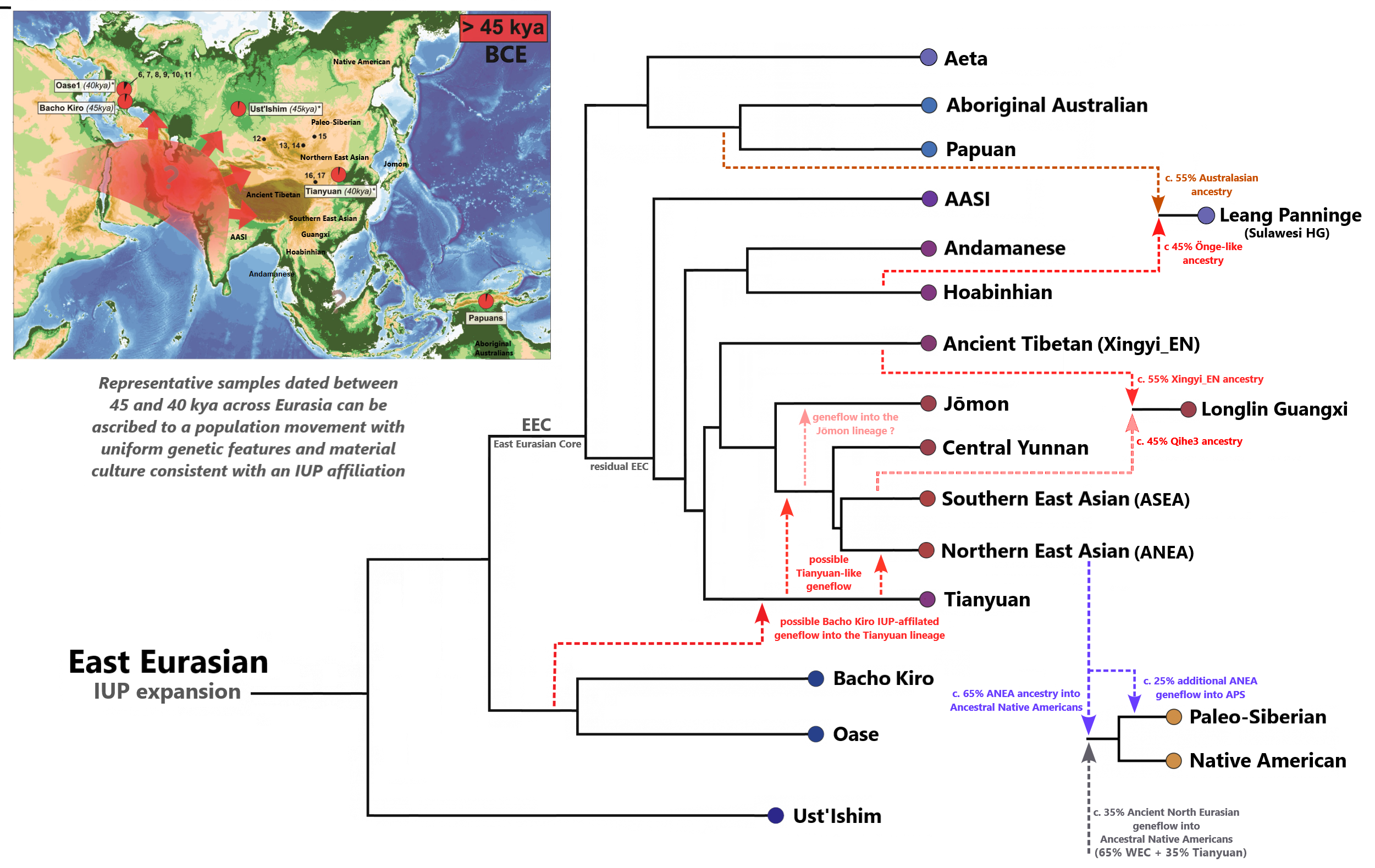
Phylogenetic position of the Paleo-Siberian lineage among other Eastern Eurasians

The Ancient Paleo-Siberians are mainly defined by two human archaeological specimens: the 14,000-year-old Ust-Kyakhta-3 (UKY) individual found near Lake Baikal in southern Siberia, and the 9-10,000-year-old Kolyma_M individual found in northeastern Siberia. Ancient Paleo-Siberians derive between 30–36% ancestry from the Ancient North Eurasians (ANE), deeply related to European hunter-gatherers, with the remainder ancestry (64–70%) being derived from an East Asian source. The Ancient Paleo-Siberians are closely related to the Ancient Beringians, and modern far-northeastern Siberia communities, such as the Koryaks, as well as to Native Americans.

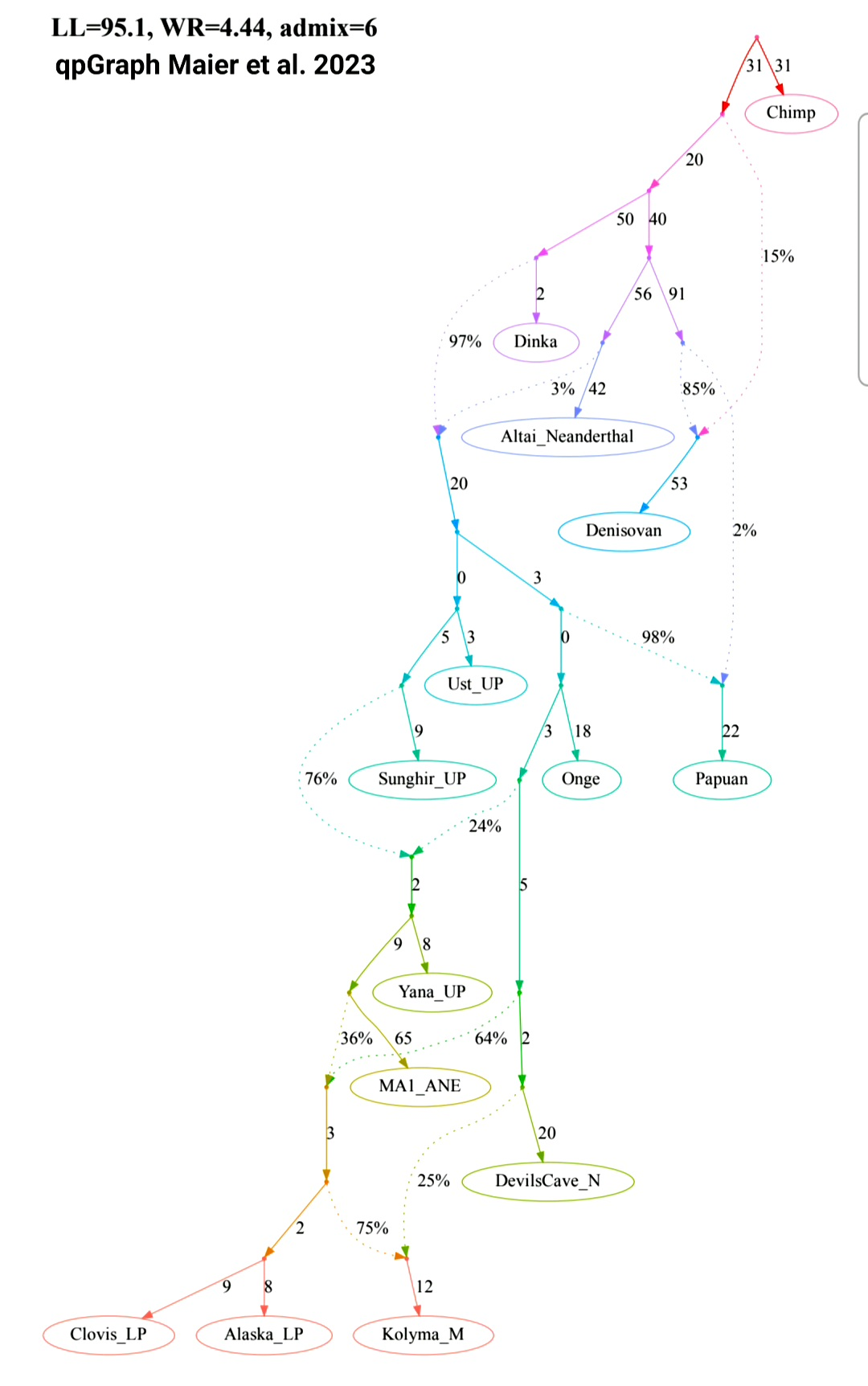
QpGraph on the possible formation of Ancient Paleo-Siberians and Native Americans.

Technologically, Ancient Paleo-Siberians have been associated with microblade technology and post-Last Glacial Maximum mammoth hunting.

The Paleo-Siberians were later largely replaced by waves of Neo-Siberians and Neolithic Amur populations, which may be associated with the expansion of early Uralic and Yukaghir speakers, followed later on by Tungusic, Turkic, and Mongolic speakers.

Ancient Paleo-Siberians, in conjunction with an Inner Northeast Asian (Yumin-like) lineage, gave rise to the Cisbaikal_LNBA ancestry, which may be associated with ancient Yeniseian speakers. Ancient Paleo-Siberians also formed the dominant ancestral source for Altai hunter-gatherers (7500BP), in conjunction with an ANE-rich Botai-like source, who later contributed to the genomes of Baikal hunter-gatherers and Afanasievo-like sources.

According to a 2025 study, Native American-related Paleosiberian ancestry in continental Siberia mixed with East Asian groups from the Amur River region and Inland East Asia and contributed to the genetic makeup of ancient and present Yeniseian and Uralic-speaking groups. The latter is responsible for spreading haplogroup N throughout Eurasia. They also received input from North Eurasian Hunter-Gatherers, who lived about ~10–4kya and are characterized by distinct West and East Eurasian admixture. Input from these hunter-gatherers, however, is limited in ancient and present Turkic, Mongolic and Tungusic-speaking populations from Central and Northern Eurasia, as well as pastoralists from the Late Bronze Age and Iron age such as Scythians, Sarmatians, and Xiongnu. Other studies detect Ancient Paleosiberian-related input in several ancient northern Chinese populations.

== See also ==
- Indigenous peoples of Siberia
- Paleosiberian languages

== Sources ==
- Grebenyuk, Pavel S.; Fedorchenko, Alexander Yu.; Dyakonov, Viktor M.; et al. (2022). "Ancient Cultures and Migrations in Northeastern Siberia". In Bocharnikov, V. N.; Steblyanskaya, A. N. (eds.). Humans in the Siberian Landscapes. Springer. doi:10.1007/978-3-030-90061-8_4. ISBN 978-3-030-90060-1.
- Maier, Robert; Flegontov, Pavel; Flegontova, Olga; et al. (14 April 2023). Nordborg, Magnus; Przeworski, Molly; Balding, David; Wiuf, Carsten (eds.). "On the limits of fitting complex models of population history to f-statistics". eLife. 12 e85492. Bibcode:2023eLife..1285492M. doi:10.7554/eLife.85492. ISSN 2050-084X. PMC 10310323. PMID 37057893.
- Mao, Xiaowei (10 June 2021). "The deep population history of northern East Asia from the Late Pleistocene to the Holocene". Cell. 184 (12): 3256–3266.e13. Bibcode:2021Cell..184.3256M. doi:10.1016/j.cell.2021.04.040. ISSN 0092-8674. PMID 34048699. S2CID 235226413.
- Moreno-Mayar, J. Víctor; Potter, Ben A.; Vinner, Lasse; et al. (January 2018). "Terminal Pleistocene Alaskan genome reveals first founding population of Native Americans" (PDF). Nature. 553 (7687): 203–207. Bibcode:2018Natur.553..203M. doi:10.1038/nature25173. ISSN 1476-4687. PMID 29323294. S2CID 4454580.
- Posth, Cosimo; Nakatsuka, Nathan; Lazaridis, Iosif; et al. (15 November 2018). "Reconstructing the Deep Population History of Central and South America". Cell. 175 (5): 1185–1197.e22. doi:10.1016/j.cell.2018.10.027. ISSN 0092-8674. PMC 6327247. PMID 30415837.
- Sikora, Martin; Pitulko, Vladimir V.; Sousa, Vitor C.; et al. (June 2019). "The population history of northeastern Siberia since the Pleistocene" (PDF). Nature. 570 (7760): 182–188. Bibcode:2019Natur.570..182S. doi:10.1038/s41586-019-1279-z. hdl:1887/3198847. ISSN 1476-4687. PMC 7617447. PMID 31168093. S2CID 174809069.
- Vallini, Leonardo; Zampieri, Carlo; Shoaee, Mohamed Javad; et al. (25 March 2024). "The Persian plateau served as hub for Homo sapiens after the main out of Africa dispersal". Nature Communications. 15 (1882): 1882. Bibcode:2024NatCo..15.1882V. doi:10.1038/s41467-024-46161-7. ISSN 2041-1723. PMC 10963722. PMID 38528002.
- Wang, Ke; Yu, He; Radzevičiūtė, Rita; et al. (6 February 2023). "Middle Holocene Siberian genomes reveal highly connected gene pools throughout North Asia". Current Biology. 33 (3): 423–433.e5. Bibcode:2023CBio...33E.423W. doi:10.1016/j.cub.2022.11.062. ISSN 0960-9822. PMID 36638796.
- Wong, Emily H.M.; Khrunin, Andrey; Nichols, Larissa; et al. (January 2017). "Reconstructing genetic history of Siberian and Northeastern European populations". Genome Research. 27 (1): 1–14. doi:10.1101/gr.202945.115. ISSN 1088-9051. PMC 5204334. PMID 27965293.
- Yu, He; Spyrou, Maria A.; Karapetian, Marina; et al. (1 June 2020). "Paleolithic to Bronze Age Siberians Reveal Connections with First Americans and across Eurasia". Cell. 181 (6): 1232–1245.e20. doi:10.1016/j.cell.2020.04.037. ISSN 0092-8674. PMID 32437661.
- Zeng, Tian Chen; Vyazov, Leonid A.; Kim, Alexander; et al. (4 October 2023). "Postglacial genomes from foragers across Northern Eurasia reveal prehistoric mobility associated with the spread of the Uralic and Yeniseian languages". bioRxiv 10.1101/2023.10.01.560332.
