= Ust-Kyakhta =

Ust-Kyakhta Усть-Кяхта
- Selo
- Location within Republic of Buryatia Location within Russia
- Coordinates: 50°31′N 106°16′E
- Country: Russia
- Region: Republic of Buryatia
- District: Kyakhtinsky District
- Time zone: UTC+8:00

Ust-Kyakhta (Russian: Усть-Кяхта; Buryat: Хяагтын Адаг, Khiaagtyn Adag) is a rural locality (a selo) in Kyakhtinsky District, Republic of Buryatia, Russia. The population was 1,752 as of 2010. There are 20 streets.

== Geography ==
Ust-Kyakhta is located 26 km northeast of Kyakhta (the district's administrative centre) by road. Khoronkhoy is the nearest rural locality.

== Archeological excavations ==
The Ust-Kyakhta-3 archeological site is located close to Ust-Kyakhta along the Selenga river. It was discovered in 1947 by Soviet archelologist A.P. Okladnikov. Systematic excavations started in the 1970s and since then yielded more than 40,000 stone artefacts and in 2012 also two human tooth fragments from the late Upper Paleolithic (ca. 12000 BCE).

Ancient DNA extracted from one of the fragments revealed that it belonged to a male individual that was genetically close to another late Upper Paleolithic individual from the Kolyma area in northeast Siberia, indicating that this Ancient Paleo-Siberian ancestry must have been widespread in eastern Siberia at the onset of the Holocene. Ancient Paleo-Siberian ancestry has been shown to be related to the early ancestors of Native Americans, and partially contributed to the gene pool of later populations of Siberia until the present time.
