= Ancient Northern East Asian =

Human archaeogenetic lineage

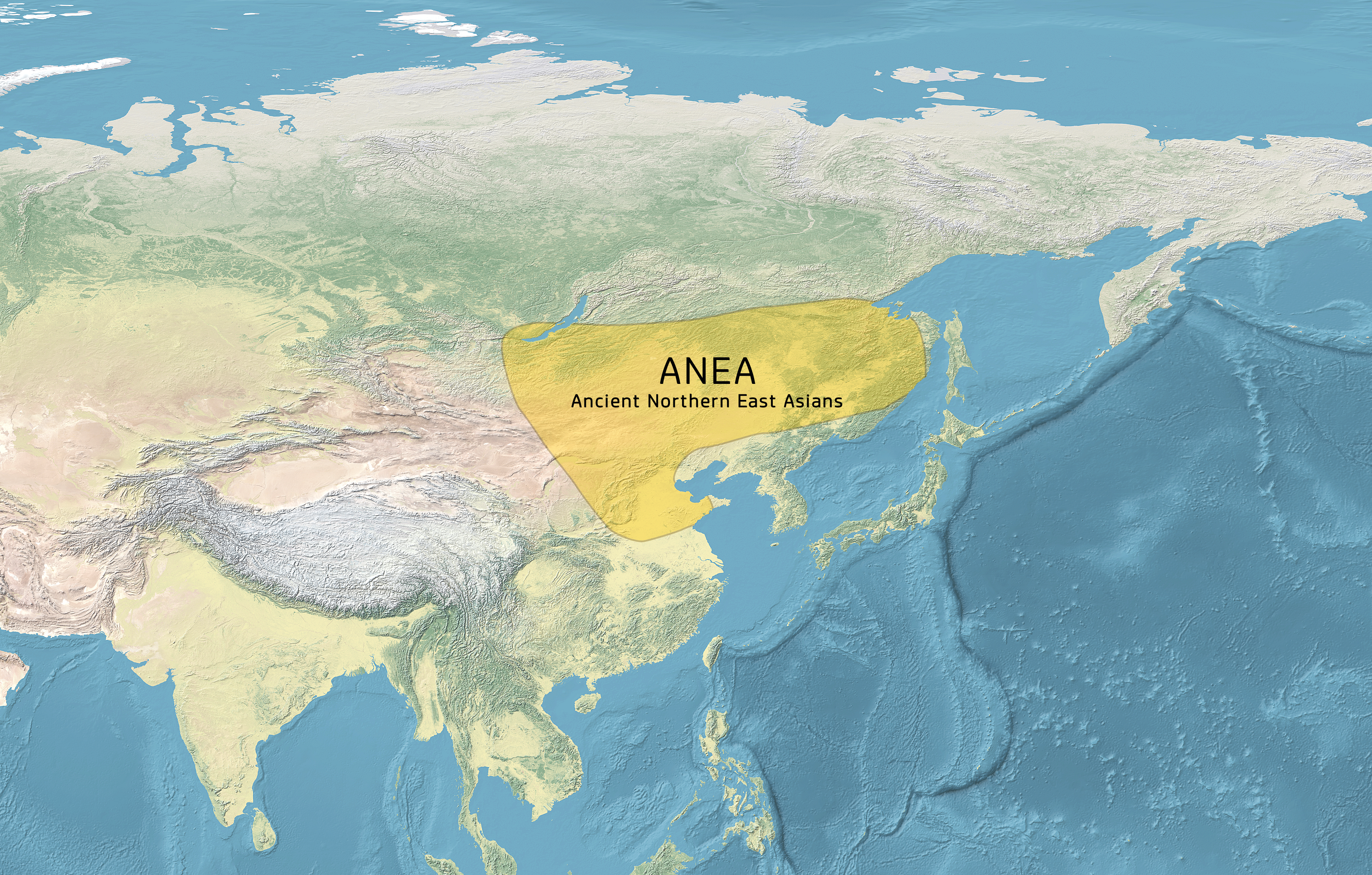
Location of the Ancient Northern East Asians

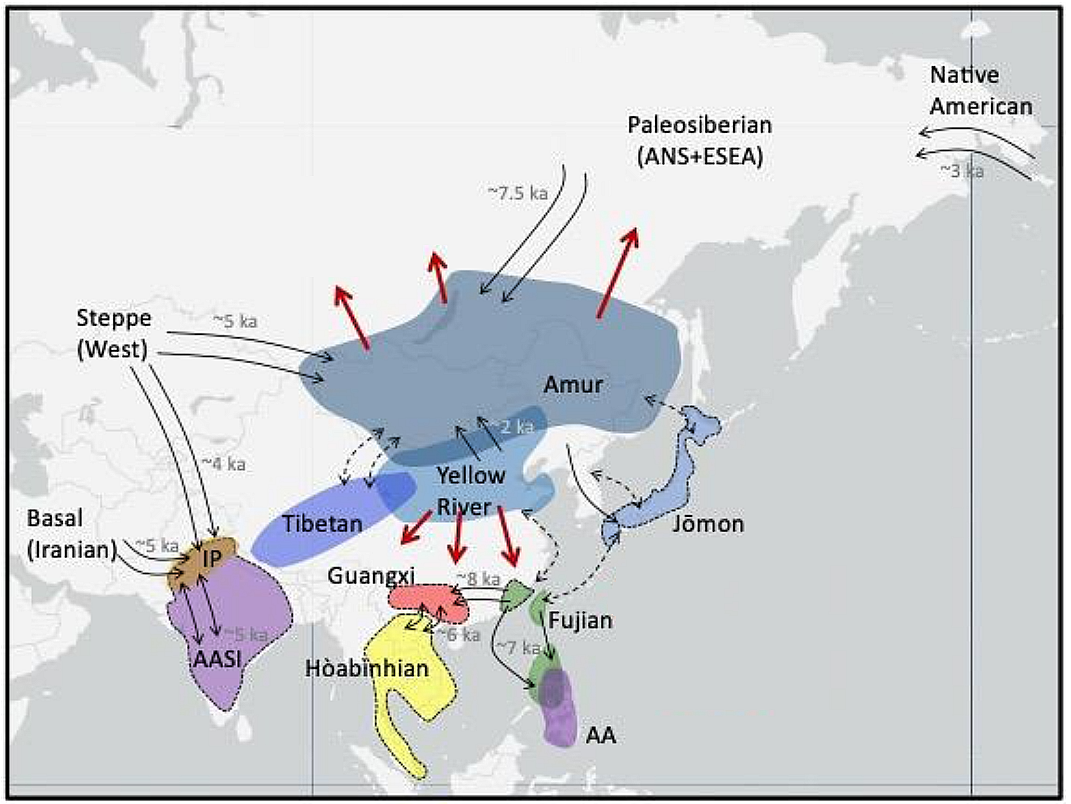
Location of the major sub-groups within the Ancient Northern East Asians, with the Yellow River farmers in the Yellow River valley, and Ancient Northeast Asians (or Amur ancestry) above

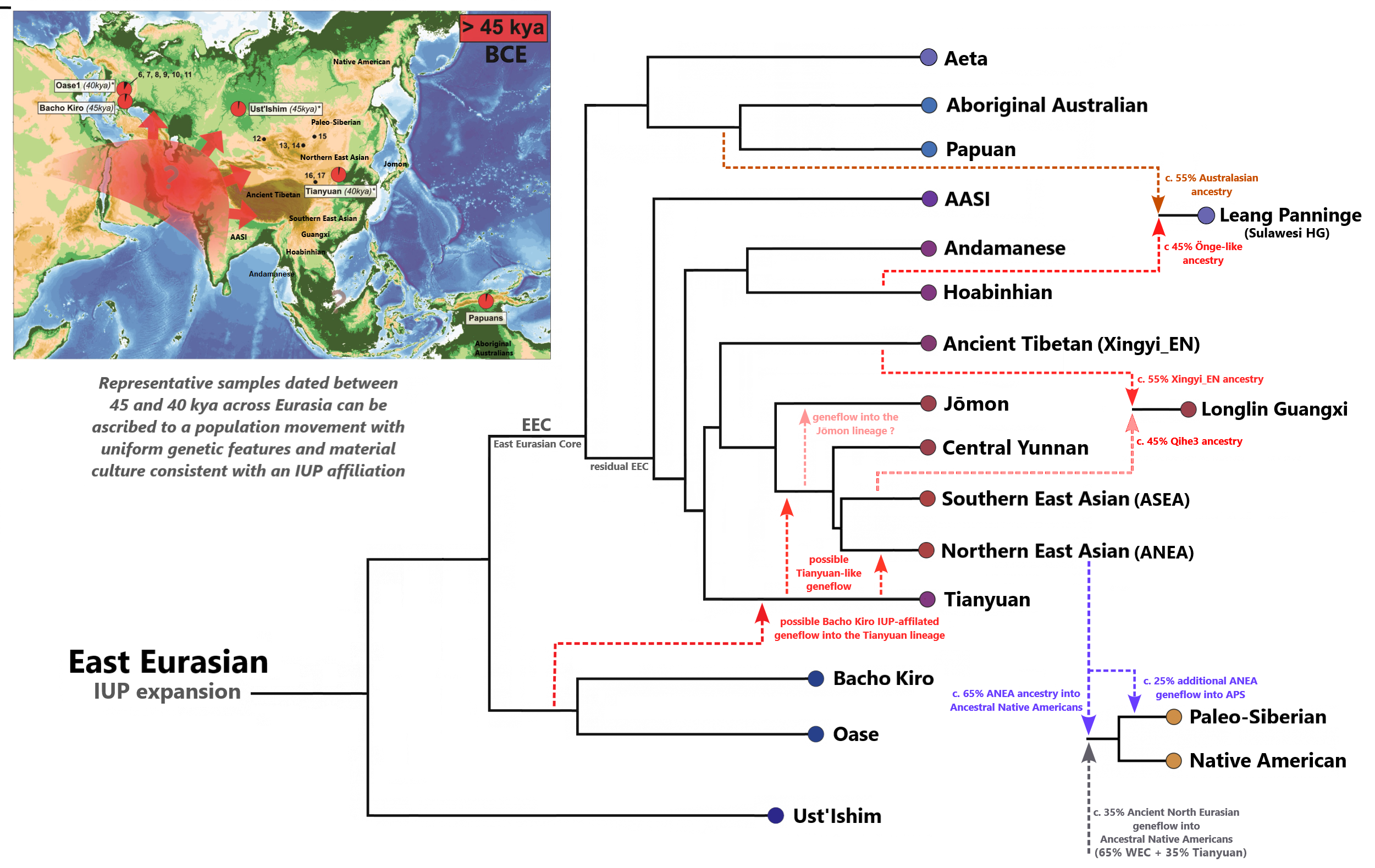
Phylogenetic position of the (Ancient) Northern East Asian lineage among other East Eurasians

In archaeogenetics, the term Ancient Northern East Asian (ANEA), also known as Northern East Asian (NEA), is used to summarize the related ancestral components that represent the Ancient Northern East Asian peoples, extending from the Baikal region to the Yellow River and the Qinling-Huaihe Line in present-day central China. They are inferred to have diverged from Ancient Southern East Asians (ASEA) around 20,000 to 26,000 BCE.

The ANEA can be differentiated into broadly three sub-groups, namely the "Ancient Northeast Asians" (ANA), "Neo-Siberians", and "Yellow River farmers". The ANEA are to be distinguished from the derived and namely similar "Ancient Northeast Asian" (ANA) lineage, which is alternatively also known as "Amur ancestry", and which forms a sub-group of the ANEA grouping, specifically ancestral to hunter-gatherer people of the 7th-4th millennia before present, in the Amur region and later expanding to far-eastern Siberia, Mongolia and the Baikal regions, but which are most closely related to other ancient northern East Asians, such as the earlier expanding "Neo-Siberians" evident in the Early Neolithic Baikal region.

In North Asia, an early branch of the Ancient Northern East Asian lineage in conjunction with the Ancient North Eurasians (ANE) resulted in the formation of the Ancient Paleo-Siberians (APS). In East Asia, an Ancient Northern East Asian lineage with a minor contribution from Ancient Southern East Asians (ASEA) led to the formation of the "Yellow River farmers". Yellow River farmers are associated with the spread of the Sino-Tibetan languages.

The "Neo-Siberians," or "inland Northeast Asians" (including Yumin hunter-gatherers and Transbaikal_EMN ancestry), are associated with an inland expansion route of Ancient Northern East Asians around 14,000 years ago. They can be distinguished from the "Amur hunter-gatherers" (7,000–14,000 years ago), who carry Ancient Northeast Asian (ANA) ancestry. The Neo-Siberians contributed mainly to Neolithic and Bronze Age populations in the Baikal region, such as the Neolithic Baikal hunter-gatherers of the Kitoi culture (5,200–4,200 BCE), Late Neolithic/Bronze Age Yakutia, and Krasnoyarsk groups of Eastern Siberia and the Altai-Sayan region. They may be linked to the early spread of Proto-Uralic speakers and, in conjunction with Ancient Paleo-Siberians, to Bronze Age Western Baikal hunter-gatherers of the Glazkovo culture (around 2,500 BCE), associated with early Yeniseian speakers.

Ancient Northeast Asians (Amur ancestry), represented by Mesolithic Amur specimens (c. 7-14kya) and subsequent samples from Mongolia, expanded after the dispersal of "Neo-Siberian" like groups, and may be associated with the spread of Turkic, Mongolic, and Tungusic speakers.

== Paleolithic and Neolithic specimens ==
The ANEA lineage is represented by a late Paleolithic specimen (c. 19kya) from the Amur region (Amur19k), as well as Early Neolithic samples including the Yumin, Devil's Gate (Far East Russia, ~7.7 kya), Shandong (coastal China, ~9.5-7.5 kya) and Lake Baikal (southern Siberia, ~7.1-6.3 kya) individuals.

== See also ==
- Genetic history of East Asians
- Ancient Southern East Asian
- Ancient East Eurasians
