= Ancient East Eurasians =

Ancestry of people living in the Asia-Pacific region

The term Ancient East Eurasian, alternatively also known as East Eurasian or Eastern Eurasian, is used in population genomics to describe the genetic ancestry and phylogenetic relationship of diverse populations primarily living in the regions of Asia-Pacific and the Americas, belonging to the "Eastern Eurasian clade" of human genetic diversity, and which can be associated with the Initial Upper Paleolithic (IUP) wave, following the Out of Africa migration at least 60,000 years ago.

== Early dispersals ==
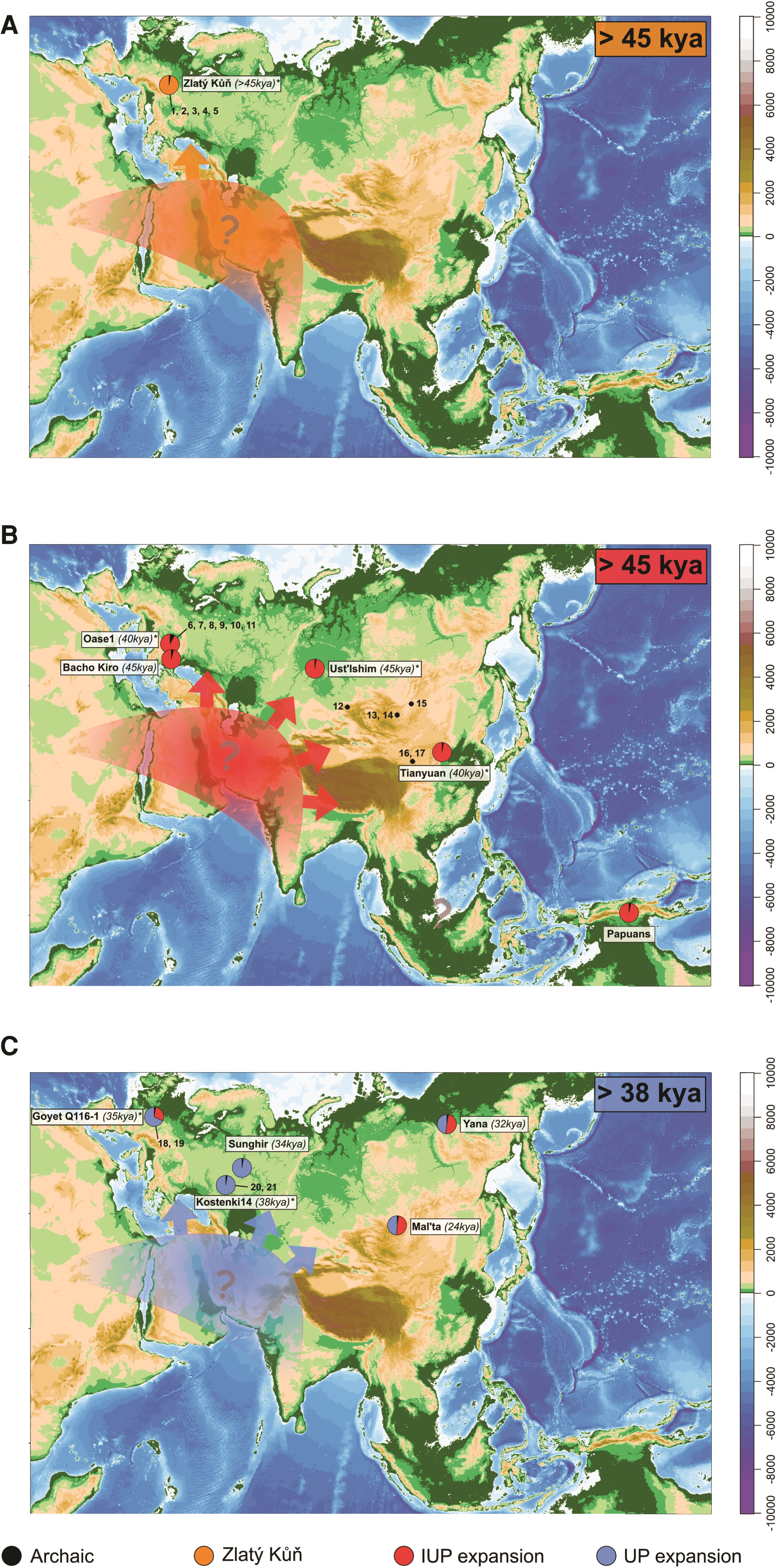
Repetitive expansions into Eurasia from a population Hub OoA. Representative samples dated between 45 and 40 ka across Eurasia can be ascribed to a population movement with uniform genetic features and material culture consistent with an IUP affiliation.

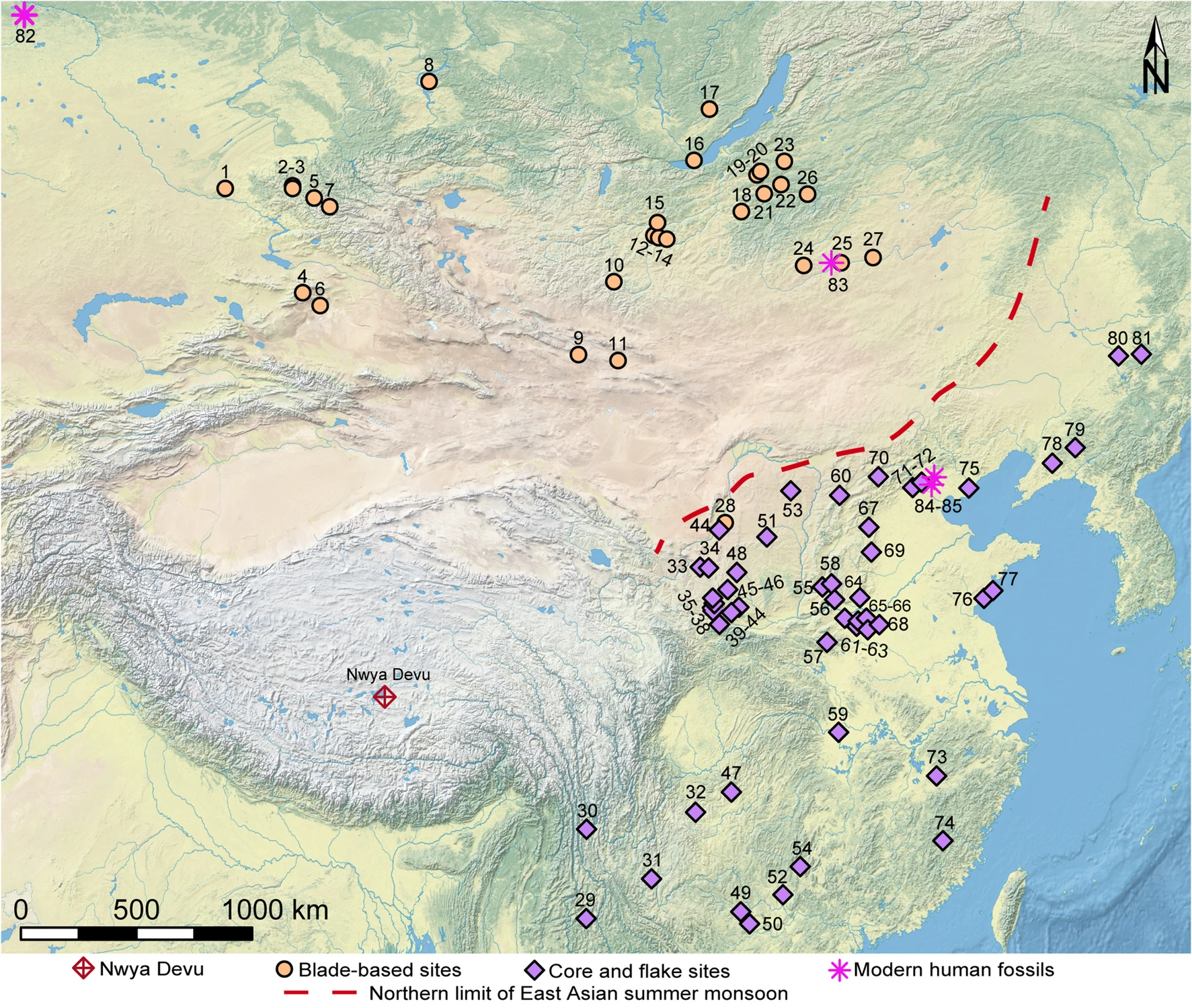
Microblade and core & flake sites in Eastern Asia

Ancient East Eurasians, modern humans of the Initial Upper Paleolithic (IUP) wave, are suggested to have diverged from Ancient West Eurasians around 48,000 years ago from a population hub likely somewhere in West Asia (perhaps on the Iranian Plateau), and expanded across Eurasia through a star-like expansion pattern at least 45,000 years ago. Based on a reevaluation of mitogenomes, Gandini et al. 2025 proposed a "long chronology," which suggested an earlier settlement of Sahul by humans who took two migration routes through South Asia about 60,000 years ago. These humans were also closely related to other East Eurasians instead of belonging to a separate population cluster.

Ancient East Eurasians started to diversify among themselves as early as 45,000 years ago. This diversification may possibly be related to the development of two major IUP-affiliated types of material culture: "microlithic blade" (or microblade) and "core & flake" (or CAF assemblages). Specific IUP populations represented by specimens found in Europe, Central Asia, and Siberia, such as the Ust'-Ishim man, Bacho Kiro, Oase 2, and Kara-Bom, that are associated with the spread of microblade sites, are inferred to have used inland routes northward into Eurasia. In contrast, IUP populations represented by specimens found in South, Southeast, and East Asia, as well as Oceania, such as the Tianyuan man, that are associated with the spread of core & flake sites, are inferred to have used a southern dispersal route along the southern coast of Asia.

The IUP populations that expanded through southern dispersal route are inferred to be the ancestors of all modern East Eurasian populations (dubbed as "East Eurasian Core" or EEC). EEC populations subsequently diversified rapidly from South and Southeast Asia at least 40,000 years ago, and became ancestral to modern populations in Eastern Eurasia, Oceania, and the Americas, notably Eastern Asians (East Asians, Southeast Asians, Northeast Asians), Indigenous Americans, Oceanians, Pacific Islanders and partly South Asians, Central Asians and Northwest Asians. South Asia may have acted as central hub for the peopling of Eastern Asia and Australasia.

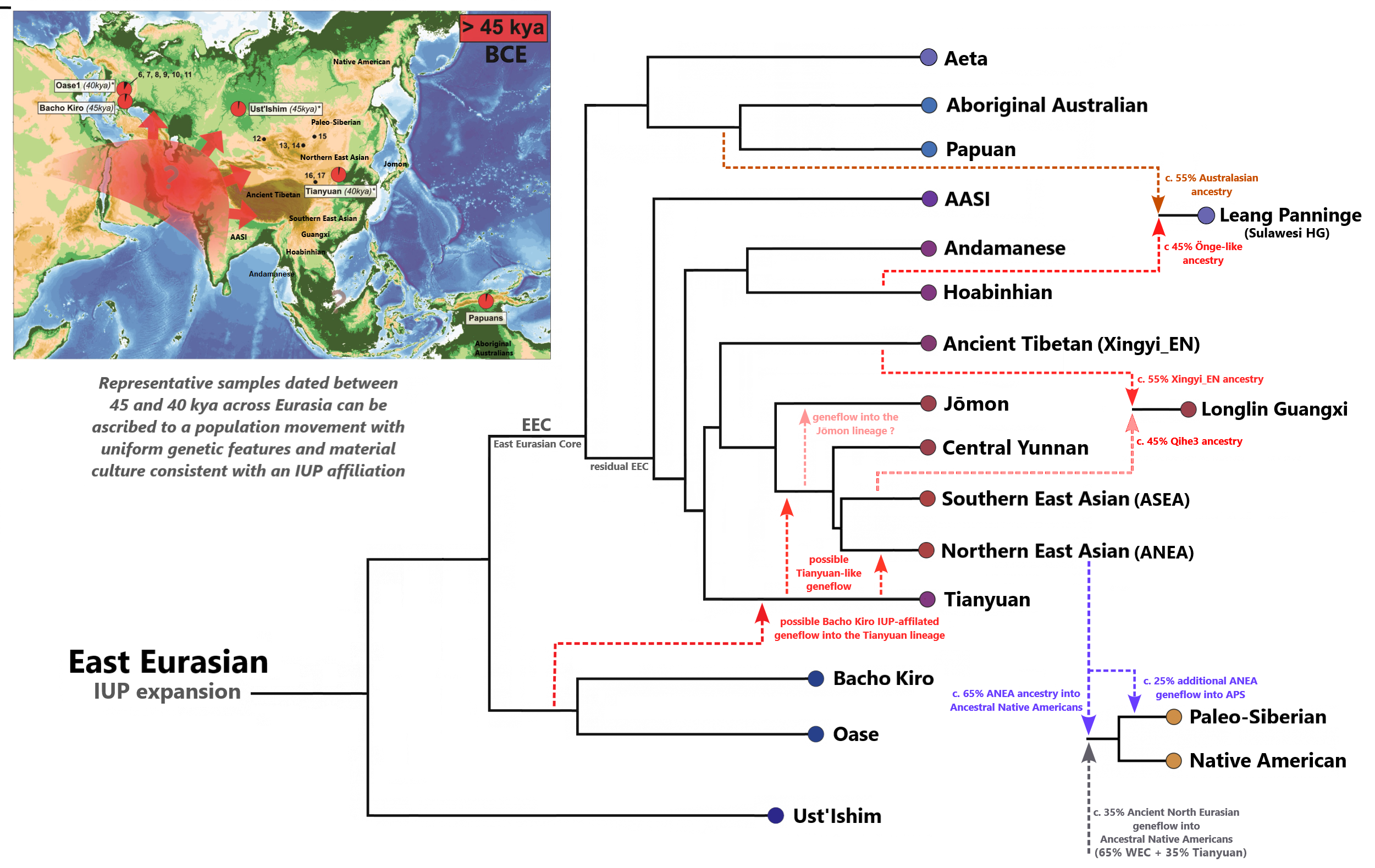
Inferred model for the phylogenetic substructure of Eastern Eurasian populations.

== East Eurasian lineages ==
Major East Eurasian ancestry lineages which contributed to modern human populations include the following:

- Australasian lineage (AA) — refers to an ancestral population that contributed primarily to Oceanians and partially to Pacific Islanders. Ancient populations partially derived from this lineage include the early Sahul populations (Lake Mungo) and the hunter gatherers of Wallacea (Besséʼ). Modern representatives include Aboriginal Australians, Papuans, Melanesians and the Aeta.
- Ancient Ancestral South Indian lineage (AASI) — refers to an ancestral population that primarily contributed to Upper Paleolithic indigenous populations of South Asia. Partially represented by 5,000 – 1,500 year old Indus Periphery individuals as well as modern South Asians. Highest presence among tribal groups of southern India like the Paniya and Irula. While the lineage is occasionally represented by the distantly related Andamanese peoples, serving as an imperfect proxy, the Andamanese groups are genetically closer to the Basal Asian Hoabinhian and Tianyuan specimens, or represent a very early divergence on the Australasian branch.
- East and Southeast Asian lineage (ESEA) — refers to an ancestral population that primarily contributed to present-day East Asians, Southeast Asians and Northeast Asians, Indigenous Americans and partially to Central Asians, Northwest Asians and Pacific Islanders. Ancient representatives include the Tianyuan, Hoabinhian, as well as later Ancient East Asians (ANEA and ASEA lineages).

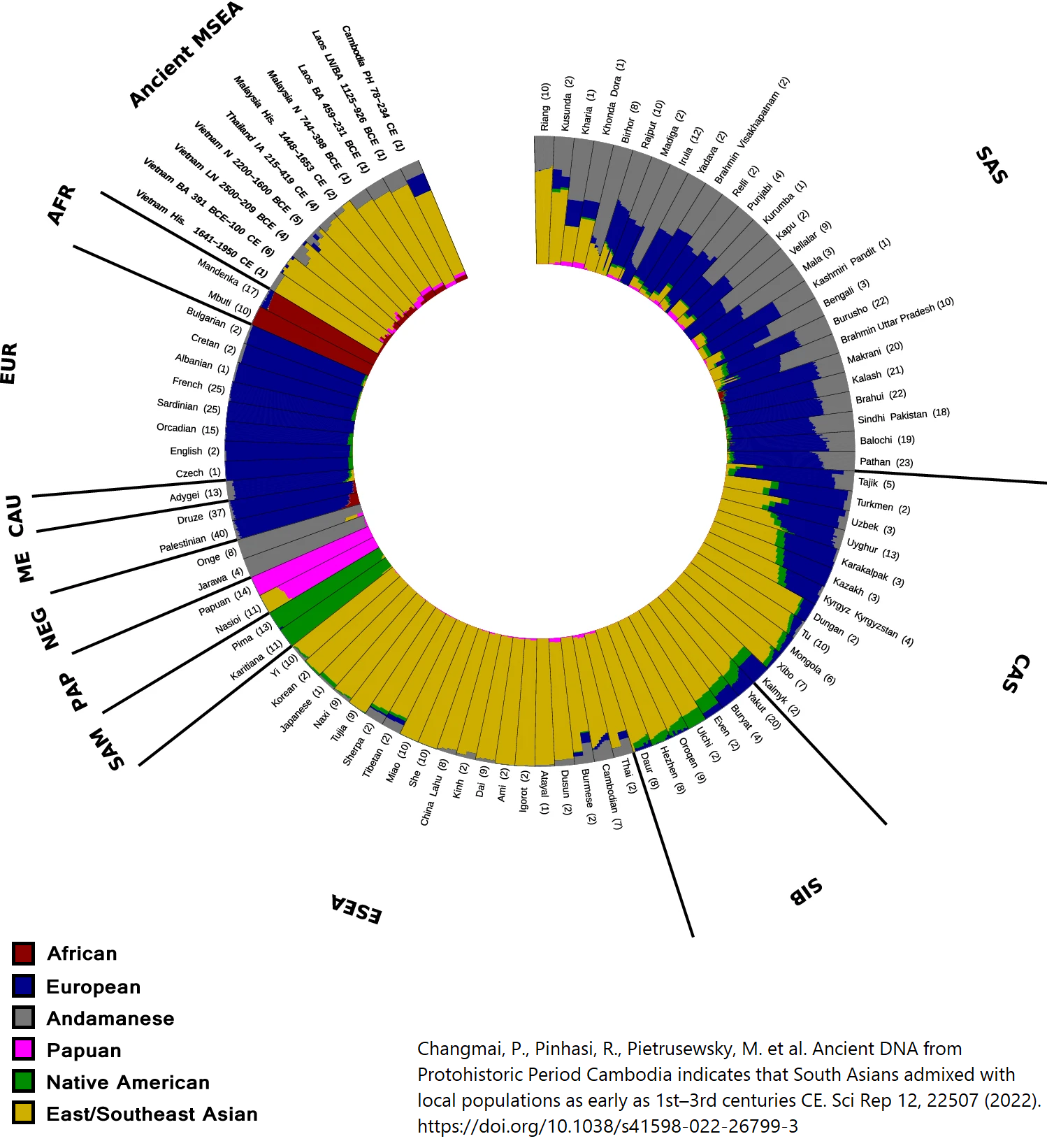
Estimated ancestry components among selected modern populations per Changmai et al. (2022).

The "Australasian," "Ancient Ancestral South Indian," and "East and Southeast Asian" lineages display a closer genetic relationship to each other than to any non-Asian lineages, as well as being closer to each other than to any of the early East Eurasian IUP lineages (Bacho Kiro etc.), and together represent the main branches of "Asian-related ancestry," which diverged from each other at least 40,000 years ago. The Australasian lineage however received higher archaic admixture in the Oceania region, and may also harbor some small amounts of "xOoA" admixture from an earlier human dispersal, which did not contribute to any other human population. Alternatively, Australasians can be described as nearly equally admixture between a "Basal East Asian" source (represented by Tianyuan or Onge) and a deeper East Eurasian lineage not sampled yet. However, other studies suggest that the indigenous inhabitants of Sahul were closely related to other East Asians and did not receive any distinct ancestry. They were also believed to have diverged from other East Eurasians before Tianyuan-related populations. Whilst studies suggest a simultaneous split between the ancestors of Andamanese, Mainland Asians and Australasians, there is evidence that the Andamanese briefly shared genetic drift with the ancestors of Tianyuan-related populations before diverging. Groups like Papuans were also believed to have diverged from other East Eurasians before Tianyuan-related populations. Genetic differences between them and Tianyuan-related populations were likewise attributed to archaic hominin admixture.

Traces of an unsampled deeply diverged East Eurasian lineage can be observed in the genome of ancient and modern inhabitants of the Tibetan Plateau. While modern Tibetans mostly derive their ancestry from a northern East Asian source (specifically Yellow River farmers), a minor, but significant contribution stems from a deeply diverged East Eurasian local "ghost population" that was distinct from other deeply diverged lineages such as Ust'Ishim, Hoabinhian/Onge or Tianyuan, representing the local Paleolithic population of the Tibetan Plateau. The remains of a 7,100 year old specimen from Yunnan, known as Xingyi_EN, were found to represent a new deeply branching Basal Asian lineage, which is closely related to the inferred ghost ancestry among Tibetans.

Deeper IUP-associated East Eurasian lineages have been associated with the remains of the Oase and Bacho Kiro cave specimens in southeastern Europe, and represent an inland migration northwards associated with the dispersal of IUP material culture, deeply diverged from all other East Eurasian populations (EEC). These deep East Eurasian populations did not contribute significantly to later Eurasian populations although they left variable amounts of geneflow to subsequent Upper Paleolithic European groups, such as the Goyet Caves specimen (GoyetQ116-1; c. 17–23%) associated with the Aurignacian culture, or the Sungir specimen (c. 0–14%) associated with the Gravettian culture (via Aurignacian geneflow). In contrast, the Upper Paleolithic European Kostenki-14 specimen, did not display evidence for IUP-affiliated admixture.

A deep IUP-affiliated lineage may have also contributed ancestry (up to 39%) to the Tianyuan man, explaining the observed affinity between Tianyuan and GoyetQ116-1, as well as GoyetQ116-1 and BachoKiro_IUP. This variegated East Eurasian substrate found among the GoyetQ116-1 specimen may hint to "yet undescribed complexities within the IUP population branch." This lineage may also be affiliated with IUP sites in Siberia and Northwest China, but currently no archaeogenetic data for these sites is available.

The exact relationship of the Ust'-Ishim man from Siberia to other IUP/East Eurasian lineages is not well resolved yet. The Ust'-Ishim man forms a near trifurication between West Eurasian (Kostenki-14) and IUP/East Eurasian lineages, but shares a short period of evolutionary drift with Eastern Eurasians. The Ust'Ishim lineage is inferred to have not contributed ancestry to modern human populations.

== See also ==
- Genetic history of East Asians
- Genetic history of Southeast Asia
- Genetic history of South Asians
- Peopling of India
- Peopling of Oceania
- Ancient North Eurasian
