= Bacho Kiro Cave =

Archaeological site in Bulgaria

- пещера Бачо Киро (Bulgarian)
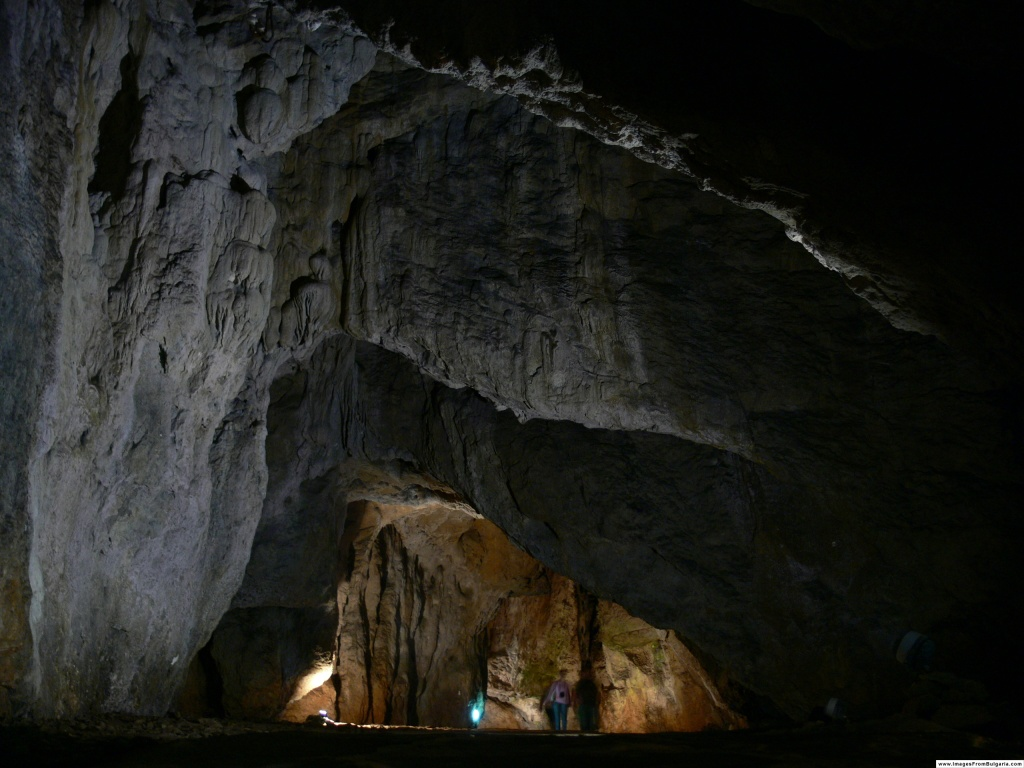
- Interior of the cave

- location in Bulgaria Bacho Kiro Cave (Bulgaria)
- 42°56′48″N 25°25′49″E
- Location: canyons of the Andaka and Dryanovo River, near Dryanovo town
- Region: Bulgaria

The Bacho Kiro Cave (Bulgarian: пещера "Бачо Киро") is situated 5 km (3.1 mi) west of the town Dryanovo, Bulgaria, only 300 m (980 ft) away from the Dryanovo Monastery. It is embedded in the canyons of the Andaka and Dryanovo River. It was opened in 1890 and the first recreational visitors entered the cave in 1938, two years before it was renamed in honor of Bulgarian National Revival leader, teacher and revolutionary Bacho Kiro. The cave is a four-storey labyrinth of galleries and corridors with a total length of 3,600 m (11,800 ft), 700 m (2,300 ft) of which are maintained for public access and equipped with electrical lights since 1964. An underground river has over time carved out the many galleries that contain countless stalactone, stalactite, and stalagmite speleothem formations of great beauty. Galleries and caverns of a 1,200 m (3,900 ft) long section have been musingly named as a popular description of this fairy-tale underground world. The formations succession: Bacho Kiro's Throne, The Dwarfs, The Sleeping Princess, The Throne Hall, The Reception Hall, The Haidouti Meeting-Ground, The Fountain and the Sacrificial Altar.

== Human remains ==
The site has yielded the oldest human remains ever to be found in Bulgaria. At one of the earliest known Aurignacian burials (layer 11), two pierced animal teeth were found and ordered into the distinct Bachokiran artifact assemblage. Radiocarbon dated to over 43,000 years ago, they currently represent the oldest known ornaments in Europe. With an approximate age of 46,000 years, human fossils consist of a pair of fragmented mandibles including at least one molar. Whether these early humans were in fact Homo sapiens or Neanderthals was disputed until morphological analysis of a tooth and mitochondrial DNA of bone fragments established that remains were those of Homo sapiens. In samples F6-620 and AA7-738 identified mitochondrial haplogroup M, in samples WW7-240 and CC7-335 determined the mitochondrial haplogroup N, in sample CC7-2289 identified mitochondrial haplogroup R, in sample of BK-1653 identified mitochondrial haplogroup U8.

Three Initial Upper Paleolithic individuals (c. 44,000 to 40,000 years ago) from Bacho Kiro Cave were each found to have relatively high levels of Neanderthal ancestry, with their genomes suggesting a recent Neanderthal ancestor in all three individuals perhaps six or seven generations back.

In the single dispersal Out of Africa theory, it is believed that populations related to the Initial Upper Palaeolithic population of Bacho Kiro Cave contributed ancestry to later Asian populations and early West Europeans such as the c. 35,000 year old individual from the Goyet Caves, Belgium, known as 'GoyetQ116-1'. Populations related to these earlier individuals did not contribute detectable ancestry to later European populations.

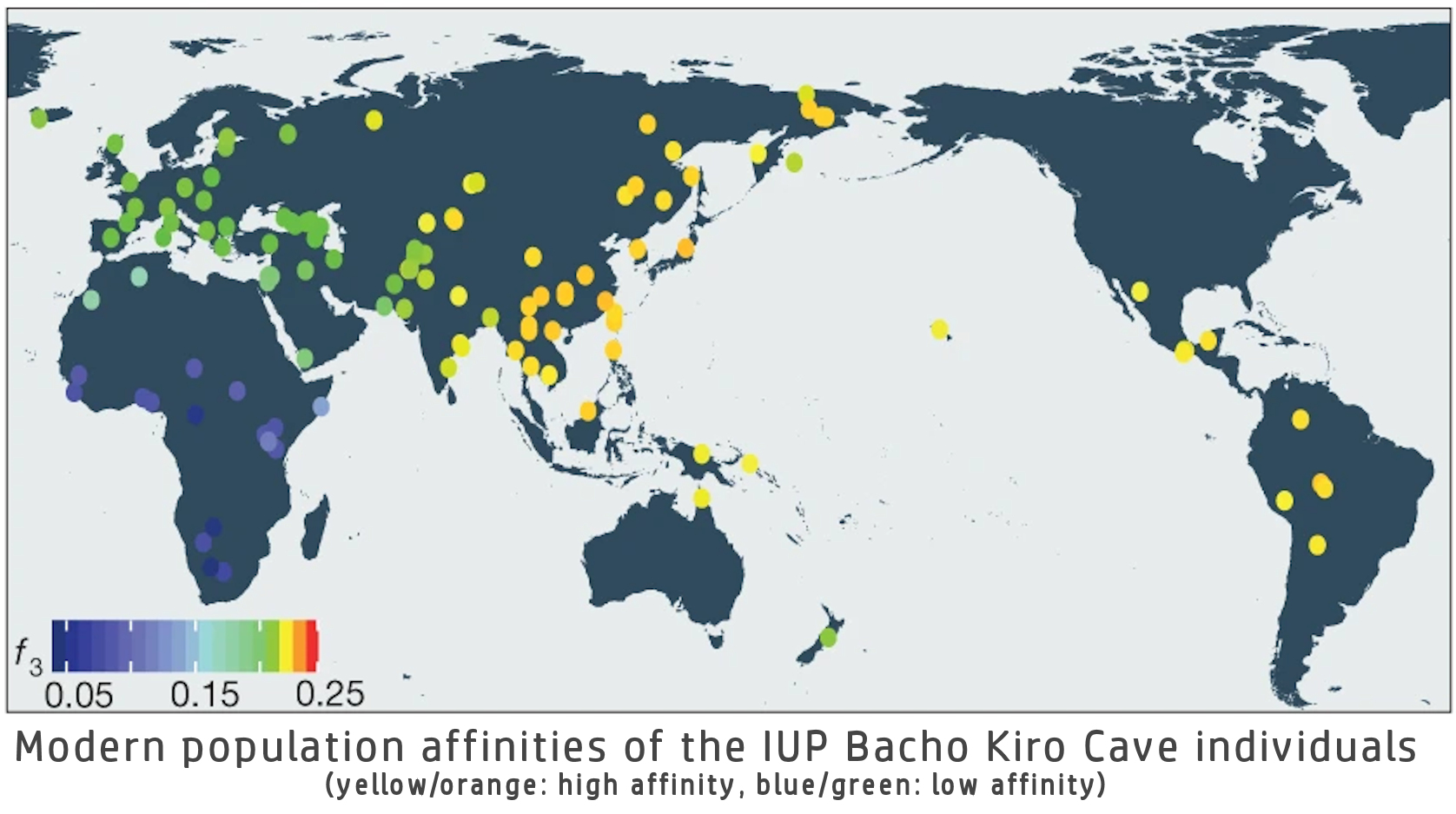
The Initial Upper Paleolithic individuals from Bacho Kiro were closer to the Tianyuan man, and to modern-day East Asians, Central Asians and Native Americans, than to Europeans or Africans.

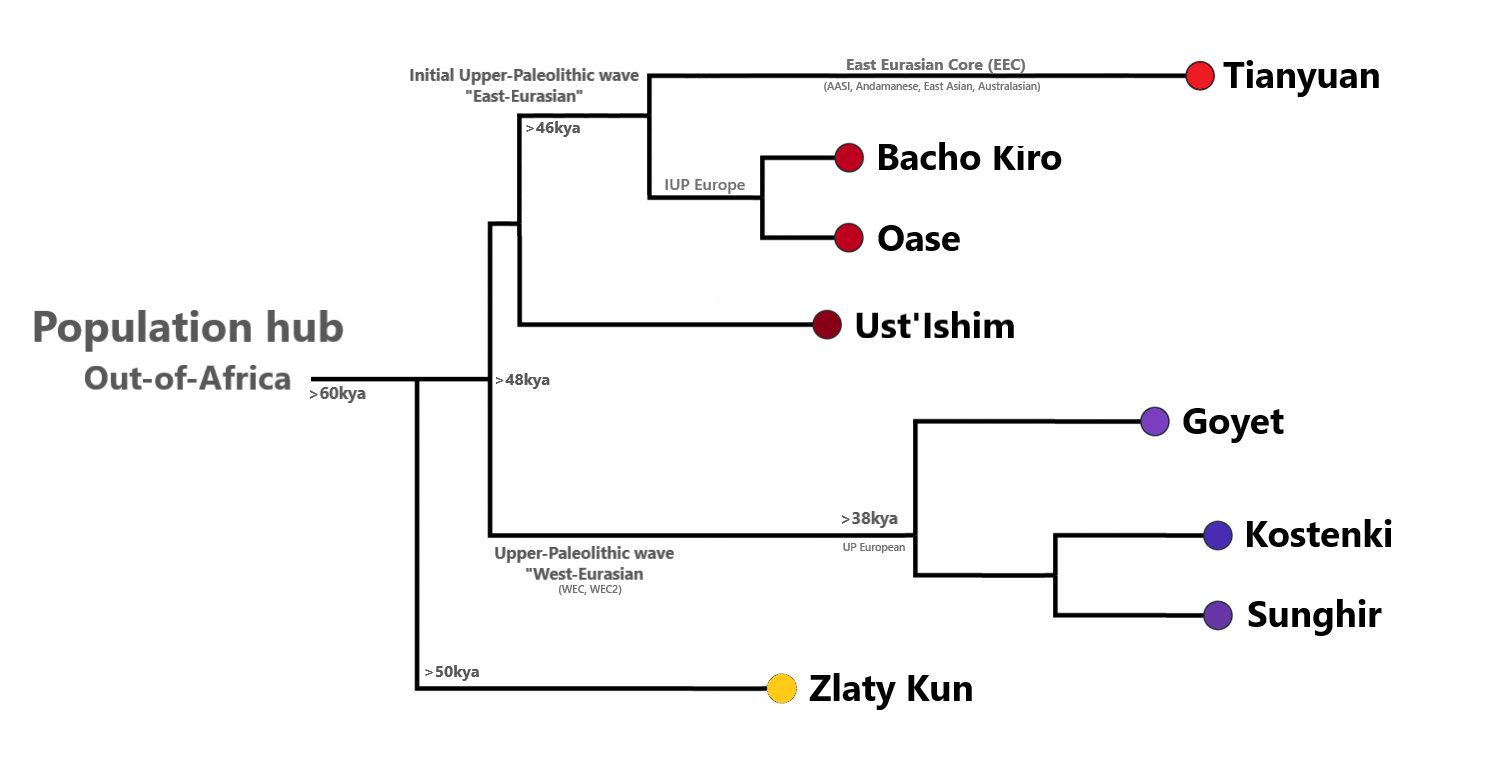
Phylogenetic position of ancient Upper Paleolithic Eurasian specimens.

However, in the multiple dispersal Out of Africa theory, East Asians are found to have a more distant split time from East African populations (73,000 to 88,000 years ago) compared to modern Europeans (57,000 to 76,000 years ago) which could mean that the Bacho Kiro remains could be from a migration of anatomically modern humans from Asia.

In 2022, a study determined that the IUP-affiliated Bacho Kiro remains were part of an Initial Upper Paleolithic wave (at least 45,000 years ago) "ascribed to a population movement with uniform genetic features and material culture" (Ancient East Eurasians), and sharing deep ancestry with other ancient specimens such as the Ust'-Ishim man and the Tianyuan man, as well as ancestors of modern-day Papuans (Australasians). The Bacho Kiro population was also closely related to the Peștera cu Oase specimens, which both were associated with the IUP material culture in Europe, and got absorbed by the later Upper Paleolithic migration wave associated with West Eurasians (represented by the GoyetQ116-1 and Kostenki-14 remains). The IUP-affiliated populations however contributed some ancestry to later Upper Paleolithic Europeans associated with the Aurignacian culture and to a lesser extent, the Gravettian culture. Around 19% ancestry of the GoyetQ116-1 individual is derived from a Bacho Kiro IUP-like source, while up to 39% ancestry of the Tianyuan man is derived from an IUP-affiliated source distantly related to the Bacho Kiro IUP remains, explaining the unusual affinity between GoyetQ116-1 and Tianyuan. Other studies suggest that IUP-affiliated Bacho Kiro remains pre-dated the split between East Asians and Europeans or were part of the earliest East Eurasian expansions in Eurasia and later became genetically distinct through additional admixture with archaic humans. A 2023 study suggested that Tianyuan man and GoyetQ116-1 derived their IUP ancestry from early related populations that lacked the additional Neanderthal ancestry found in Bacho Kiro IUP.^{(see supplemental material)}

Following that, later individuals from the Bacho Kiro Cave, such as the c. 35,000 year old 'BK1653' were more closely related to modern European populations than to East Asians. According to a 2023 study, the 'BK1653' individual can be modeled as a mixture of a Sunghir-related lineage and a lineage that's ancestral to all known European hunter-gatherer lineages, including Zlatý kůň-related lineages.^{(see supplemental material)}

== See also ==
- Bohunician
- Dryanovo Monastery
