= Southern dispersal =

Early human migration out of Africa

Southern dispersal, also known as the great coastal migration or rapid coastal settlement, was an early human migration along the southern coastal route, from the Arabian Peninsula via Persia and India to Southeast Asia and Oceania, with later descendants of those migrations eventually colonizing the rest of Eastern Eurasia and the Americas.

According to this thesis, the dispersal was possible thanks to the development of a multipurpose subsistence strategy, based on the collection of organisms, fish, crustaceans, molluscs, and algae, which are part of the biotic communities of the intertidal zone, the transition ecosystem between land and sea between the upper limit of high tides and the lower limit of low tides, i.e. organisms left behind by the waters which retreat during ebb tide, and which people could harvest from the ground and reefs left unsubmerged or in shallow water at low tide. In support of this hypothesis there are the remains found on an ancient Pleistocene reef, now emerged, near the locality of Abdur in Eritrea. Its rocks are the result of the compaction of marine debris about 125,000 years ago and contain fossil remains of a complex biotic community of the coast of the time: large colonies of corals, oyster shells, large clams and other bivalve molluscs, gastropods and echinoderms. A group of geologists and paleontologists found many blades and tools made of quartz, obsidian and other fine volcanic stone, mixed with the remains of shells. This would prove that over 100,000 years ago human populations of Homo sapiens exploited the intertidal zone for food purposes.

The coastal route theory is primarily used to describe the initial peopling of West Asia, India, Southeast Asia, New Guinea, Australia, Near Oceania, and East Asia beginning between roughly 70,000 and 50,000 years ago.

It is linked with the presence and dispersal of mtDNA haplogroup M and haplogroup N, as well as the specific distribution patterns of Y-DNA haplogroup C, haplogroup D, and haplogroup FT in these regions.

The theory proposes that early modern humans, some of the bearers of mitochondrial haplogroup L3, arrived in the Arabian peninsula about 70,000–50,000 years ago, crossing from East Africa via the Bab-el-Mandeb strait. It has been estimated that from a population of 2,000 to 5,000 individuals in Africa, only a small group, possibly as few as 150 to 1,000 people, crossed the Red Sea. The group would have travelled along the coastal route around Arabia and Persia to India relatively rapidly, within a few thousand years. From India, they would have spread to Southeast Asia ("Sundaland") and Oceania ("Sahul").

== Genetic and archaeologic evidence ==
The southern route dispersal is primarily linked to the Initial Upper Paleolithic expansion of modern humans and "ascribed to a population movement with uniform genetic features and material culture" (Ancient East Eurasians), which was the major source for the peopling of the Asia–Pacific region. While certain Initial Upper Paleolithic populations represented by specimens found in Central Asia and Europe, such as the Ust'-Ishim man, Bacho Kiro cave or Oase 2, are inferred to have used inland routes, the ancestors of all modern East Eurasian populations are inferred to have used the Southern dispersal route through South Asia, where they subsequently diverged rapidly and gave rise to modern populations in Eastern Eurasia, Oceania, and the Americas.

== See also ==
- Recent African origin of modern humans
- Paleoanthropology
