= Yana =

Yana may refer to:

== Locations ==
- Yana, Burma, a village in Hkamti Township in Hkamti District in the Sagaing Region of northwestern Burma
- Yana, India, a village in the Uttara Kannada district of Karnataka, India
- Yana, Nigeria, an administrative capital in Bauchi State, Nigeria
- Yana, Sierra Leone, a town in Northern Province of Sierra Leone
- Yana (river), a river in Yakutia, Russia
  - Yana Rhinoceros Horn Site, an archaeological site
- Yana (Sea of Okhotsk), a river in Magadan Oblast, Russia
- Yana Plateau, mountain plateau in Sakha Republic, Russia
- Yana Point, the point forming the west side of the entrance to Bruix Cove, Antarctica

== Other ==
- Yana (name), list of individuals with the name
- Yana (Buddhism), a mode or method of spiritual practice in Buddhism
- Yana language, an extinct language isolate
- Yana people, a group of Native Americans indigenous to Northern California in the central Sierra Nevada Mountains
- "Yana Yana", a single by the Lebanese pan-Arab singer Sabah

== See also ==
- Yannan (disambiguation)
