= AG3 =

AG3 may refer to:

- AG3 battery, a common button cell battery for consumer electronics
- Heckler & Koch G3, a battle rifle developed in 1956 by Heckler & Koch GmbH
- Artificial Girl 3, the third installment in an adult video game series by Illusion
- Human specimen Nb.3 from Afontova Gora
