= Sungir =

Upper Paleolithic archaeological site in Russia

Coordinates: 56°10′34″N 40°30′09″E

- Сунгирь (Russian)
- Sunghir
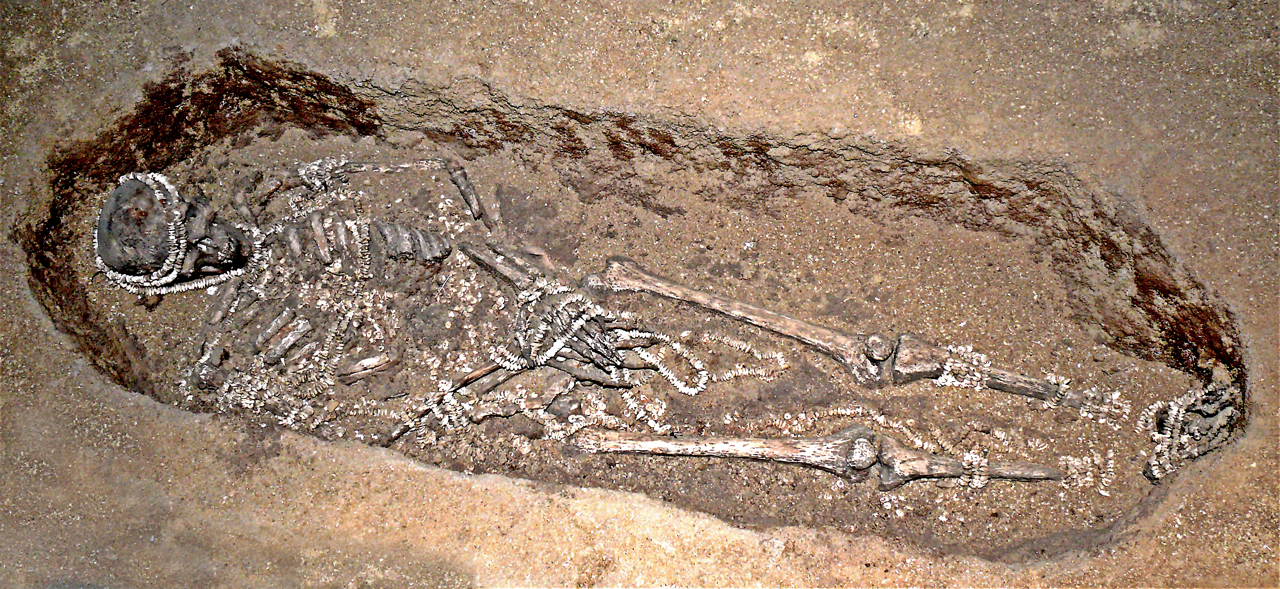
- Paleolithic burial of Sungir

- Sunghir and contemporary burials and cultures c. 40,000~30,000

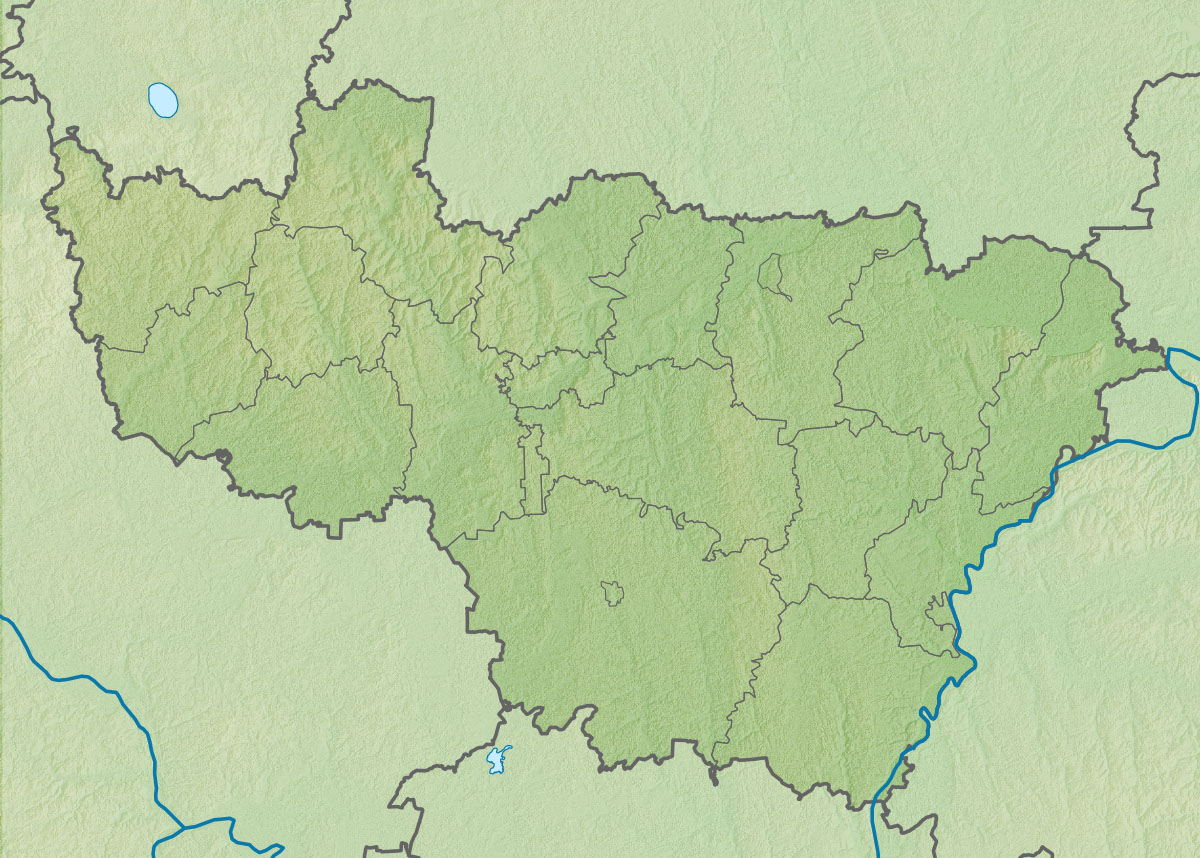
- Location of Sungir Sungir (Russia)
- Type: open-air site
- Location: Vladimir Oblast, Russia

Sungir (Russian: Сунгирь, sometimes spelled Sunghir) is an Upper Paleolithic archaeological site in Russia and one of the earliest records of modern Homo sapiens in Eurasia. It is situated about 200 kilometers (120 mi) east of Moscow, on the outskirts of Vladimir, near the Klyazma River. It is dated by calibrated carbon analysis to between 32,050 and 28,550 BCE. Additional pollen finds suggest the relative warm spell of the "Greenland interstadial (GI) 5" between the 30,500 and 30,000 BCE as most probable dates.

The settlement area was found to have four burials: the remains of an older man and two adolescent children are particularly well-preserved, and the nature of the rich and extensive burial goods suggests they belonged to the same class. In addition, a skull and two fragments of human femur were also found at the settlement area, and two human skeletons outside the settlement area without cultural remains.

== History ==
This site was discovered in 1955, in the course of local digging from clay pits. Some 4,500 square kilometers (1,700 sq mi) were excavated in sixteen field seasons between 1957 and 1977 (Bader 1965; 1967; 1978; 1998). Archeology teams from the Geological Institute of the Russian Academy of Science (R.A.S.), University of Groningen, Oxford University, and the University of Arizona in the United States have all worked on the excavations and related studies to review the findings from the site.

They determined that the cultural layer was located in what is called Bryansk soil, related to the period (thirty-two to twenty-four millennia ago) of the corresponding interstadial of the Valdai Ice age of the Late Pleistocene. Evidence of only surface dwellings on the site led the team to conclude it was likely used seasonally.

== Burials ==
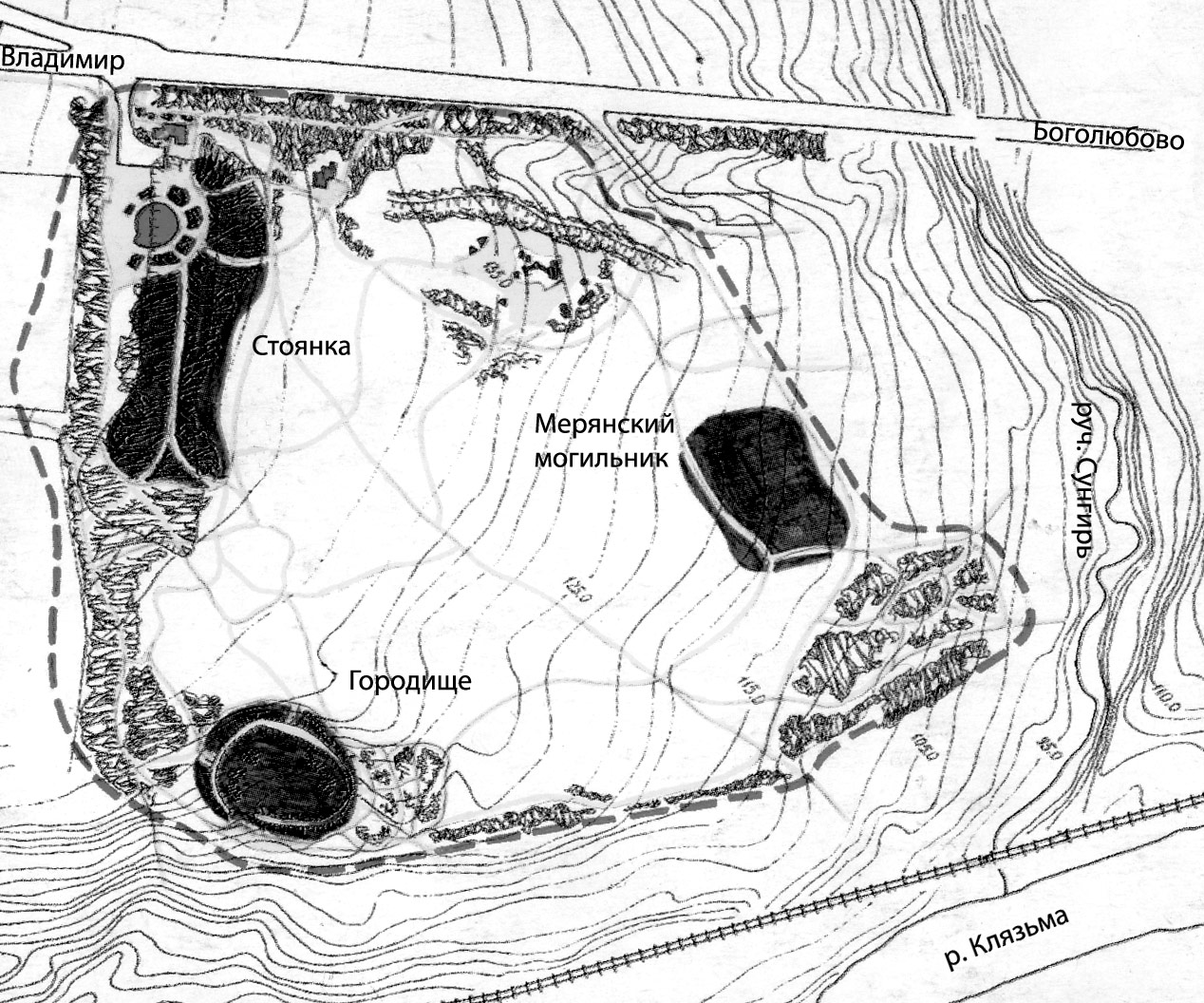
Map of the site. The grave is located at the center-right. At the bottom left: a hillfort. The river is at the bottom.

Graves 1 and 2 at Sungir are described as "the most spectacular" among European Gravettian burials. The adult male was buried in what is called Grave 1 and the two adolescent children in Grave 2, placed head-to-head, together with an adult femur filled with red ochre. The three people buried at Sungir were all adorned with elaborate grave goods that included ivory-beaded jewelry, clothing, and spears. More than 13,000 beads were found (which would have taken 10,000 hours to produce). Red ochre, an important ritual material associated with burials at this time, covered the burials.

The children are considered a twin burial, thought to have ritual purpose, possibly sacrifice. The findings of such complete skeletons are rare in late Stone Age, and indicate the high status of the male adult and children. The children had the same mtDNA, which may indicate the same maternal lineage, but new analyses determined they were not siblings.

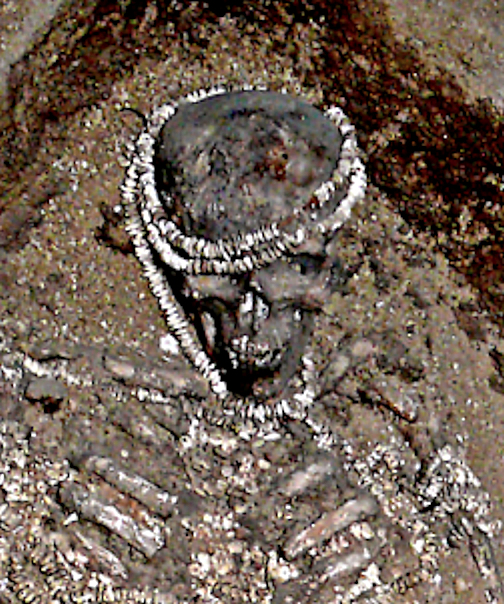
Sunghir burial, decorated head.

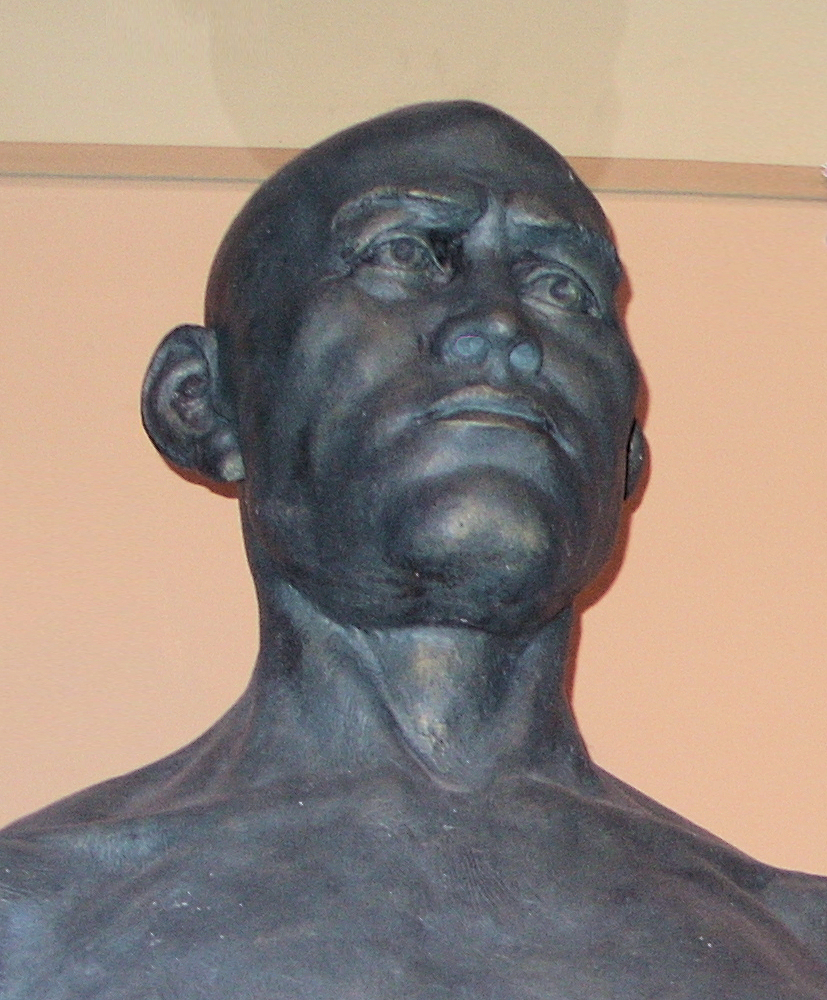
Sunghir man, forensic reconstruction by M.M. Gerasimov

The site is one of the earliest examples of ritual burials and constitutes important evidence of the antiquity of human religious practices. The extraordinary collection of grave goods, the position of the bodies, and other factors all indicate it was a burial of high importance. Two other remains at the site are partial skeletons.

The remains are held by the Institute of Ethnology and Anthropology of R.A.S., Moscow. In 2004, the International Seminar, "Upper Paleolithic People from Sunghir, Russia," was hosted by the Department of Archaeology, University of Durham, U.K. It is the second of two major conferences about this site.

Two books have been published in Moscow about the findings. Upper Palaeolithic Site Sungir (graves and environment) (1998) was the first complete publication about the site, including an inventory of artifacts, reconstruction of the Paleolithic man's clothes, archaic counting and calendar. The second part of the book displays the reconstruction of the environment by geological, palynological, zoological data.

The second book, Homo Sungirensis (2000) edited by T.I. Alexeeva et al., includes articles published since the first book, and new anthropological data derived from morphology, palaeopathology, X-ray study, histology, trace elements and molecular genetic analyses. It has an illustrated catalogue of all the skeletal materials.

== Archaeogenetics ==
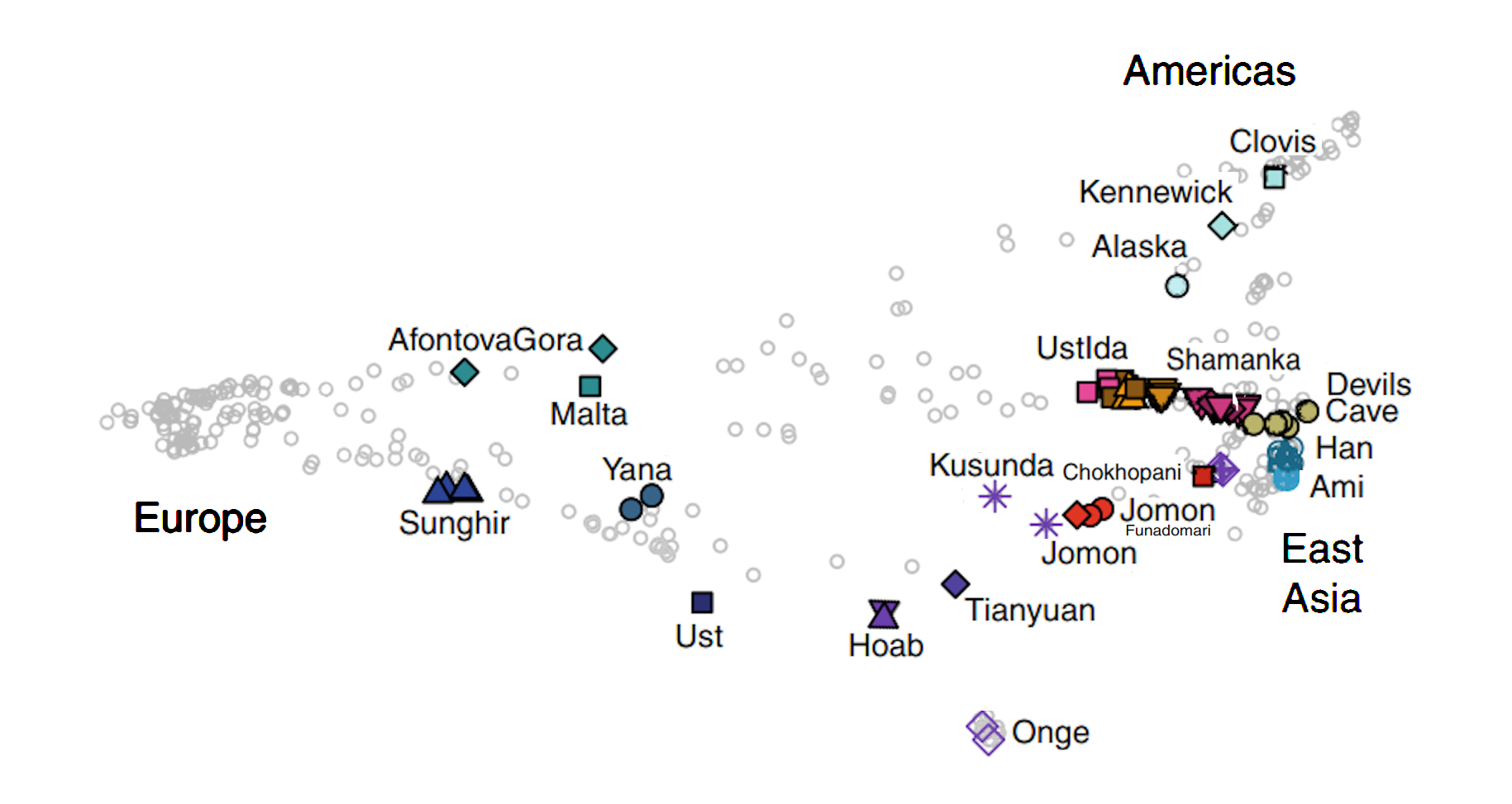
Genetic proximity of Sunghir to Ancient North Eurasian populations (Yana, Mal'ta and Afontova Gora) and modern European populations, within a principal component analysis of ancient and present-day individuals from worldwide populations.

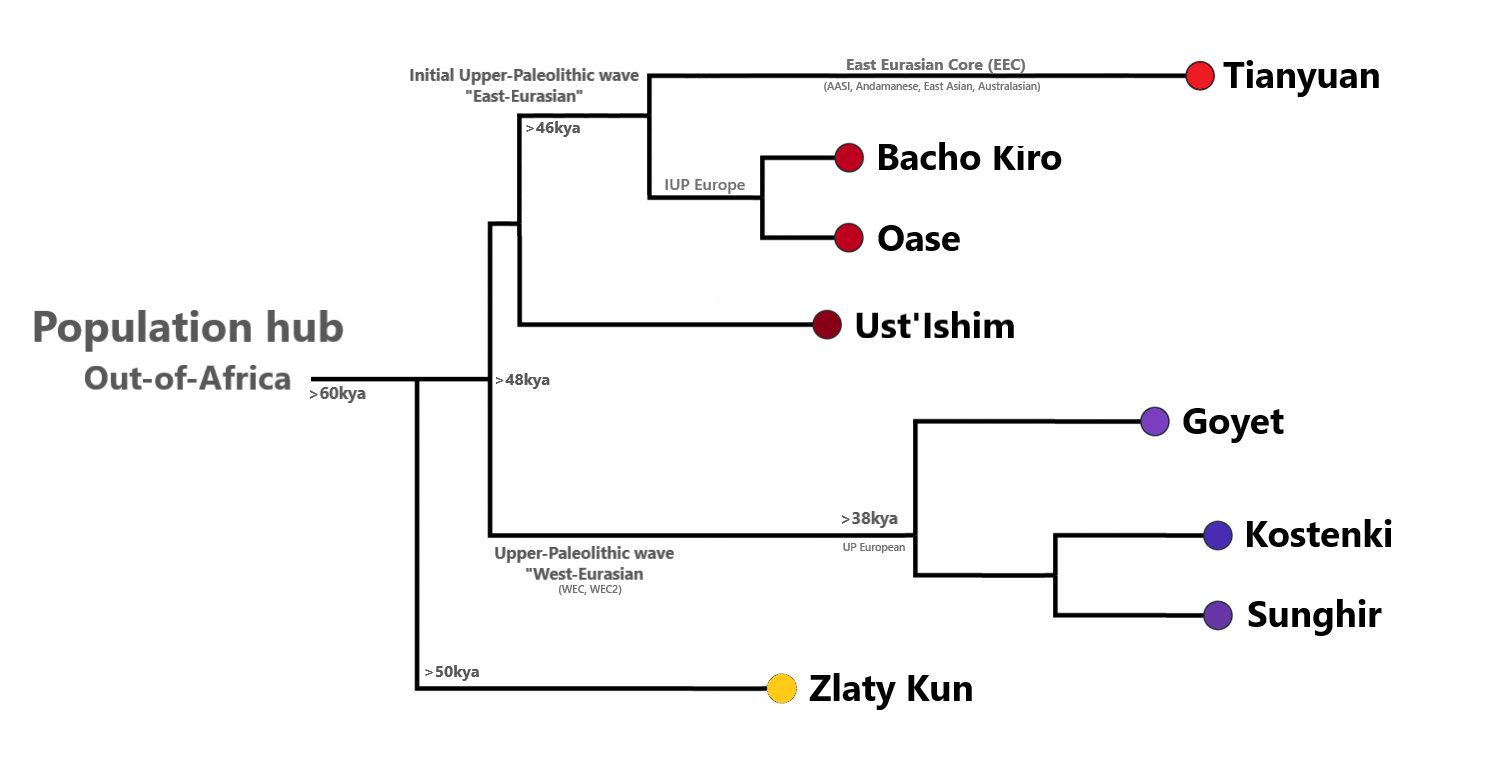
Phylogenetic position of ancient Upper Paleolithic Eurasian specimens.

In 2017, researchers successfully sequenced the DNA of multiple individuals from Sungir (c. 34,000 years BP), including one from Burial 1 (Sunghir I) and three from Burial 2: the two adolescent burials (Sunghir II and Sunghir III) and the adult femur accompanying the burial (Sunghir IV). The younger adolescent from Burial 2, Sunghir III, yielded high coverage genomes. Sungir III was previously thought to be female; however, genetic analysis shows that all four of the tested individuals at Sungir were male. Contrary to previous interpretations of the burials, genetic analysis shows that none of the individuals are closely related (none of the individuals were third-degree relatives or closer).

However, when compared against other populations, the individuals at Sungir are genetically closest to each other. The individuals at Sungir show closest genetic affinity to the individuals from Kostenki, with closer affinity to the individual from Kostenki 12 than to the individual from Kostenki 14. The closer affinity between Kostenki 12 and Sungir individuals was mutual, with Kostenki 12 being closer to the Sungir remains than to Kostenki 14. The Sungir individuals are inferred to have descended from a lineage that was forming a sister branch to Kostenki 14. The Sungir individuals also show close genetic affinity to various individuals belonging to Vestonice Cluster buried in a Gravettian context, such as those excavated from Dolní Věstonice. In terms of their Y-chromosome, they all belonged to a subclade of haplogroup C1 (C1a2), which was common among early West Eurasian specimens, such as the ones in Kostenki (C1b*), but today rare among Europeans. The maternal haplogroups of S I belonged to U8c, while S II, S III, and S IV belonged to a subclade of U2, which is close to the ones observed among the Kostenki specimens.

There is some evidence for low amounts (c. 2%) of Tianyuan-related (East Eurasian) geneflow into the Upper Paleolithic Sunghir population, consistent with traces of Denisovan ancestry. This type of ancestry is absent from the Kostenki14 specimen, which is regarded as "baseline" for West Eurasian (European-related) ancestry.

DNA analysis on a medieval individual from the Sungir 6 site (730-850 cal BP) showed it to belong to the mtDNA haplogroup W3a1, and Y-DNA haplogroup I2a1b2 (I-A16681).
