= Yannan =

Yunnan, Province in Southwest China

Yannan may also refer to:

- Yunnan Baiyao, Proprietary traditional Chinese medicine
- Yunnan cuisine, Culinary traditions of Yunnan
- Yunnan nuthatch, Species of nuthatch endemic to China
- Yunnan hare, Species of mammal
- Yunnan Flying Tigers F.C., Chinese football club

== Places ==
- Yunnan, Singapore, Place in Singapore
- Yunnan Ethnic Village, An ethnographic village in China
- Yunnan–Guizhou Plateau, Highland region located in southwest China
- Yannan Subdistrict, Lanzhou, Gansu, China
- Yannan Subdistrict, Yong'an, Fujian, China
- Yannan station of Shenzhen Metro, in Shenzhen, Guangdong, China

== Institutes ==
- Yunnan University, University in Kunming, China
- Yunnan Nationalities Museum, Museum in Kunming, Yunnan, China
- Yunnan Military Academy, Was a military academy based in Kunming, Yunnan, China
- Yunnan Institute of Development
- Yunnan Normal University, Provincial University in Kunming, Yunnan, China
- Yunnan Minzu University
- Yunnan clique, Military unit

== Species ==
- Yunnan horse, Extinct species of mammal
- Yunnan box turtle, Species of turtle
- Yunnan bush rat, Species of rodent
- Yunnan fulvetta, Species of bird
- Yunnan gecko, Species of lizard
- Yunnan japalure, Species of lizard
- Yunnan lake newt, Extinct species of amphibian

=== Subspecies ===
- Yunnan lar gibbon, Subspecies of ape
- Yunnan parrotbill, Subspecies of bird

== Other uses ==
- Yunnan under Ming rule, Tusi system instituted during the Yuan dynasty
- Yunnan Colorfree, 2007 soundtrack album by Yoshimio
- Yunnan Copper, Smelting company
- Yunnan Jinding Zinc, Subsidiary of Sichuan Hongda
- Yunnan–Guangxi War
- Yunnan sudden death syndrome
- Yunnan–Burma railway
- Yunnan Army

== See also ==
- Yun (disambiguation)
- Yuna (disambiguation)
- Yunan (disambiguation)
