= Yana (name) =

List of individuals with the given name of "Yana"

- Gender: Feminine

Origin
- Origin: Slavic

Yana is a feminine name of Slavic origin as well as a Japanese given name. In China, it is also written as a phonetic transcription of 亚娜 (Yà nà).

== Given name ==
- Yana (singer) (1931–1989), British singer
- Yana Alborova (born 1994), Russian-Uzbekistani foil fencer
- Yana Berezhna (born 2007), Ukrainian Paralympic swimmer
- Yana Daniëls (born 1992), Belgium footballer
- Yana Dementyeva (born 1978), Ukrainian rower
- Yana Derkach (born 1998), Ukrainian footballer
- Yana Dobrovolskaya (born 1997), Miss Russia 2016
- Yana Doroshenko (born 1994), Azerbaijani volleyball player
- Yana Egorian (born 1993), Russian fencer
- Yana Gupta (born 1979), Czech-Indian model-actress
- Yana Kalinina (born 1994), Ukrainian footballer
- Yana Kasova (born 1981), Bulgarian hurdler
- Yana Klochkova (born 1982), Ukrainian Olympic swimmer
- Yana Kramarenko (born 2002), Israeli rhythmic gymnast
- Yana Kudryavtseva (born 1997), Russian rhythmic gymnast
- Yana Kunitskaya (born 1989), Russian mixed martial artist
- Yana Marinova (born 1978), Bulgarian actress
- Yana Martynova (born 1988), Russian swimmer
- Yana Milev (born 1969), German artist, philosopher, author and sociologist
- Yana Nariezhna (born 1999), Ukrainian synchronized swimmer
- Yana Noskova (born 1994), Russian table tennis player
- Yana Pavolva (born 1996), Russian trampoline gymnast
- Yana Rudenko (born 1999), Ukrainian young professional, activist
- Yana Ruzavina (born 1982), Russian foil fencer
- Yana Santos (born 1989), Russian mixed martial artist
- Yana Shemyakina (born 1986), Ukrainian right-handed épée fencer, three-time Olympian
- Yana Sheina (born 2000), Russian footballer
- Yana Shemaieva (born 1995), better known as Jerry Heil, Ukrainian singer, songwriter and YouTuber
- Yana Toboso (born 1984), Japanese manga artist
- Yana Tsikaridze (born 1987), Canadian rhythmic gymnast
- Yana Tuniyants (born 1972), Kazak archer
- Yana Vassilyeva (born 1981), Kazak handball player
- Yana Vorona (born 2004), Russian artistic gymnast
- Yana Yordanova (born 2003), Bulgarian footballer
- Yana Zvereva (born 1989), Russian fencer

== Surname ==
- Kazuo Yana (born 1979), Japanese politician
- Nobuo Yana (born 1935), Japanese film actor
