= Yana Rhinoceros Horn Site =

Upper Palaeolithic site in northeastern Siberia

- Map of Sakha Republic showing the location of Yana RHS Yana Rhinoceros Horn Site (Sakha Republic)
- 70°43′25″N 135°25′47″E
- Location: Sakha, Russia

History
- Built: Upper Paleolithic, c. 32,000 BP

Site notes
- Area: 3,500 m^{2} (38,000 sq ft)

The Yana Rhinoceros Horn Site (Yana RHS) is an Upper Palaeolithic archaeological site situated near the lower Yana River in northeastern Siberia, Russia, north of the Arctic Circle in the far west of Beringia. Discovered in 2001 after thawing and erosion exposed animal bones and artifacts, the site features a well-preserved cultural layer due to the cold conditions. It includes hundreds of animal bones, ivory pieces, and artifacts, indicating sustained settlement and a relatively advanced level of technological development. Dating to around 32,000 calibrated years before present (cal BP), the site provides the earliest archaeological evidence for human settlement north of the Arctic Circle. The inhabitants survived extreme conditions and hunted a wide range of fauna, and the site provides perhaps the earliest unambiguous evidence of mammoth hunting by humans.

A 2019 genetic study found that the remains of two young male humans discovered at the site, dating to c. 31.6 ka BP, represent a distinct archaeogenetic lineage, named Ancient North Siberians (ANS).

The Yana RHS site is preceded in Siberia by a few Initial Upper Paleolithic archaeological sites such as Ust-Ishim (with modern human remains, 45,000 years BP), or Kara-Bom (dating to 46,620 +/-1,750 cal years BP), Kara-Tenesh, Kandabaevo, and Podzvonskaya.

== Discovery ==
In 1993, Russian geologist Mikhail Dashtzeren found a foreshaft of a spear made from the horn of a woolly rhinoceros in the Yana Valley. The discovery was made following thawing and erosion, which exposed numerous artifacts and animal bones near the site. Following this discovery, guided by Dashtzeren, an Upper Paleolithic site now known as Yana RHS was found in 2001 by archaeologist Vladimir Pitulko and colleagues. Excavations began in 2002.

== Location ==
Yana RHS Localities
Locality	Excavation dates
ASN	2001—2002
TUMS-1	2002
Northern Point	2002—2009
Yana-B	2003, 2004, 2008
Southern Point	2002—2004, 2008
Upstream Point	2004—2006
YMAM	2003—2014

The Yana RHS is located on an alluvial terrace near the left bank of the Yana river, north of the Arctic Circle, around 100 km south of the current river mouth. It is situated on the far west of the coastal lowland between the Yana River in the west and the Kolyma River in the east. The site consists of a complex of several roughly contemporaneous locations, separated by tens or hundreds of metres, over an area of more than 3500 square metres. The cultural layer is retained to a significant extent at three of these locations (Northern Point, Yana B, and Tums1). Three other locations (Upstream Point, ASN, and Southern Point) only yield surface finds. At an additional location, now known as 'Yana Mass Accumulation of Mammoth' (YMAM), a large number of mammoth remains, comprising over 1,000 mammoth bones, was discovered in 2008 by ivory hunters.

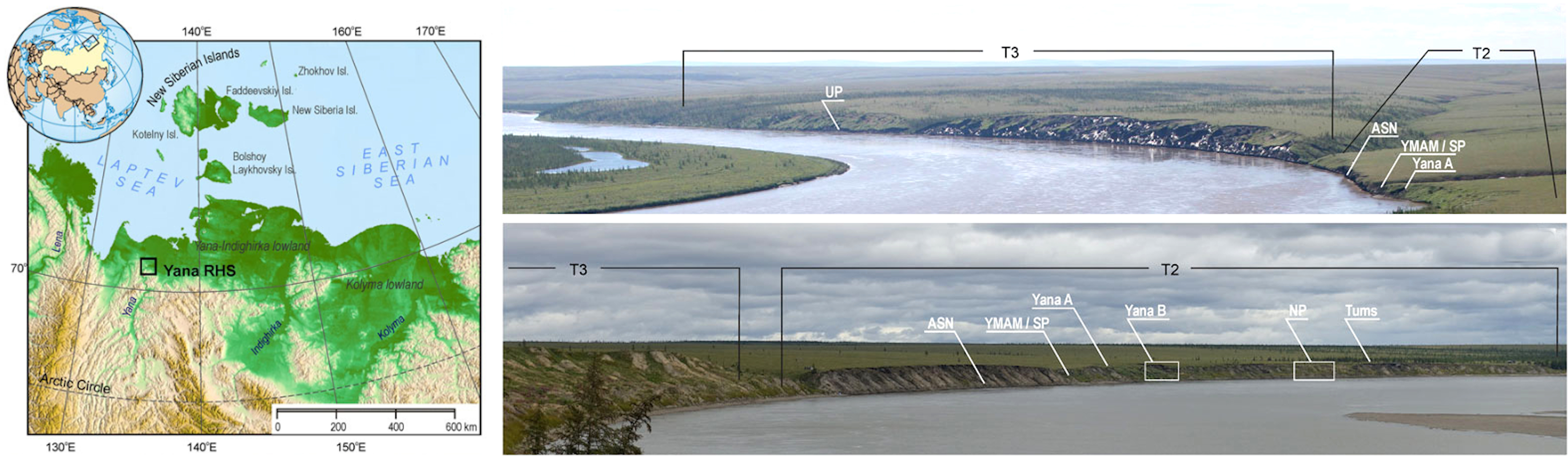
Yana RHS site location.

== Date ==
The site has been radiocarbon dated to approximately 32,000 cal BP, before the Last Glacial Maximum and more than twice the age of any previously known human settlement of the Arctic. By the time of the Last Glacial Maximum, around 21,000 cal BP, the archaeological culture represented by the Yana site had disappeared.

== Faunal remains ==
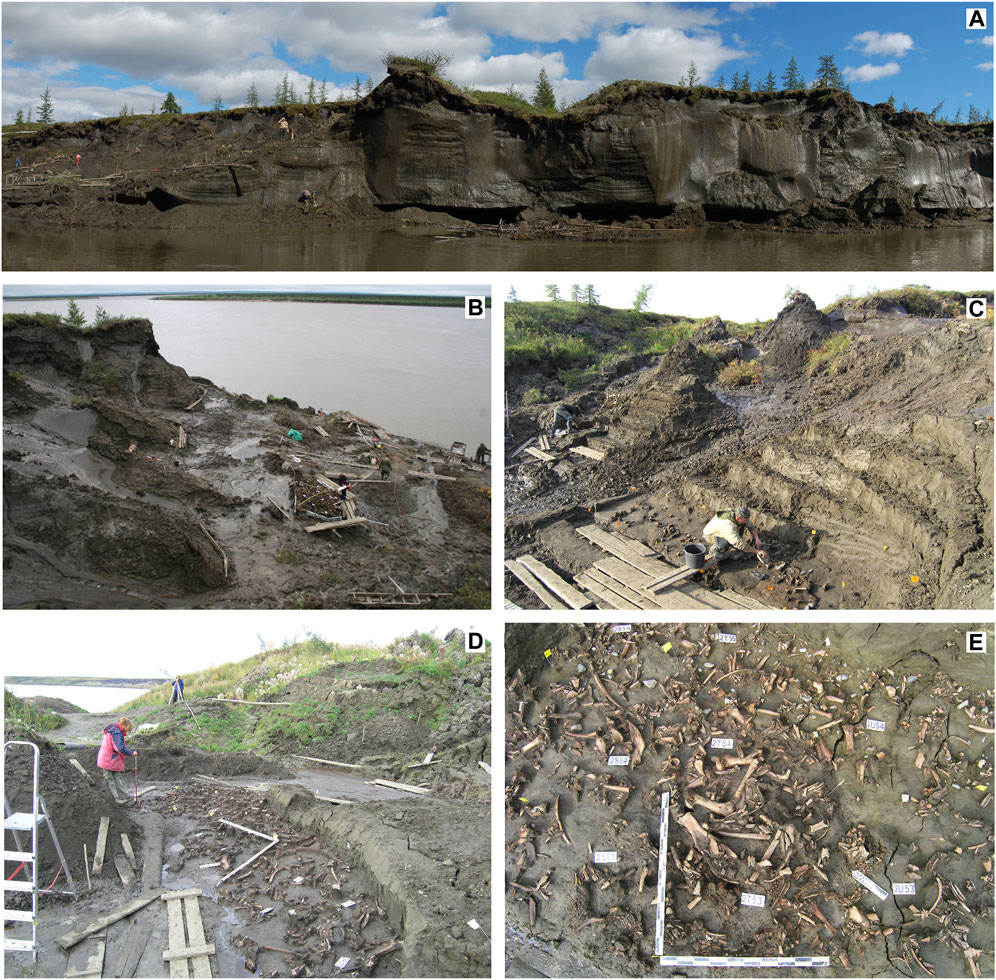
Excavation of the Northern Point area (NP) of the Yana site complex.

From the exposed cultural layer, hundreds of animal bones have been discovered at the site, from a wide variety of species, including many that are now extinct. The species include woolly rhinoceros (Coelodonta antiquitatis), woolly mammoth (Mammuthus primigenius), Pleistocene hare (Lepus tanaiticus), steppe bison (Bison priscus), horse (Equus ferus caballus), musk ox (Ovibos moschatus), wolf (Canis lupus), polar fox (Vulpes lagopus), brown bear (Ursus arctos), Pleistocene lion (Panthera spelaea), wolverine (Gulo gulo), rock ptarmigan (Lagopus mutus hyperboreus), and reindeer (Rangifer tarandus), the last of which was probably the primary source of game. There is direct evidence for the hunting of steppe bison, reindeer, and brown bear at the site. The faunal remains suggest that the human settlers at this site had a diverse diet.

Some animals were probably hunted by humans for their fur. For instance, hare skeletons are found fully articulated, and were likely snared for their pelts, which are light and warm, rather than for meat.

Until 2008, an unexpectedly low number of mammoth bones were found at the site, compared to the enormous number of bones from other mammals, which was interpreted to mean that mammoths played a limited role in the subsistence strategy of humans at the site, and had not been hunted but instead were scavenged for ivory and bone, which was used for tools and building materials. This interpretation was revised when ivory hunters discovered an additional locality nearby at a location now known as 'Yana Mass Accumulation of Mammoth' (YMAM), containing around 1,000 mammoth bones representing at least 26 individuals, and grouped according to type. At the YMAM locality, over 95 per cent of the faunal remains are mammoth, compared to around 50 per cent at Yana-B and only 3.3 per cent at Northern Point. Recent studies suggest that there is convincing evidence of sporadic mammoth hunting, perhaps every few years, which is perhaps the earliest unambiguous evidence of mammoth hunting by humans. It is likely that obtaining mammoth meat was not the main purpose of mammoth hunting at this site. Instead, mammoths were hunted mainly for ivory and bone to use as building materials, tools, and fuel. It has been suggested that people of Yana RHS selectively hunted adolescent and young adult female mammoths with tusks of a particular size and shape, facilitating the manufacture of better hunting weapons.

== Artifacts ==
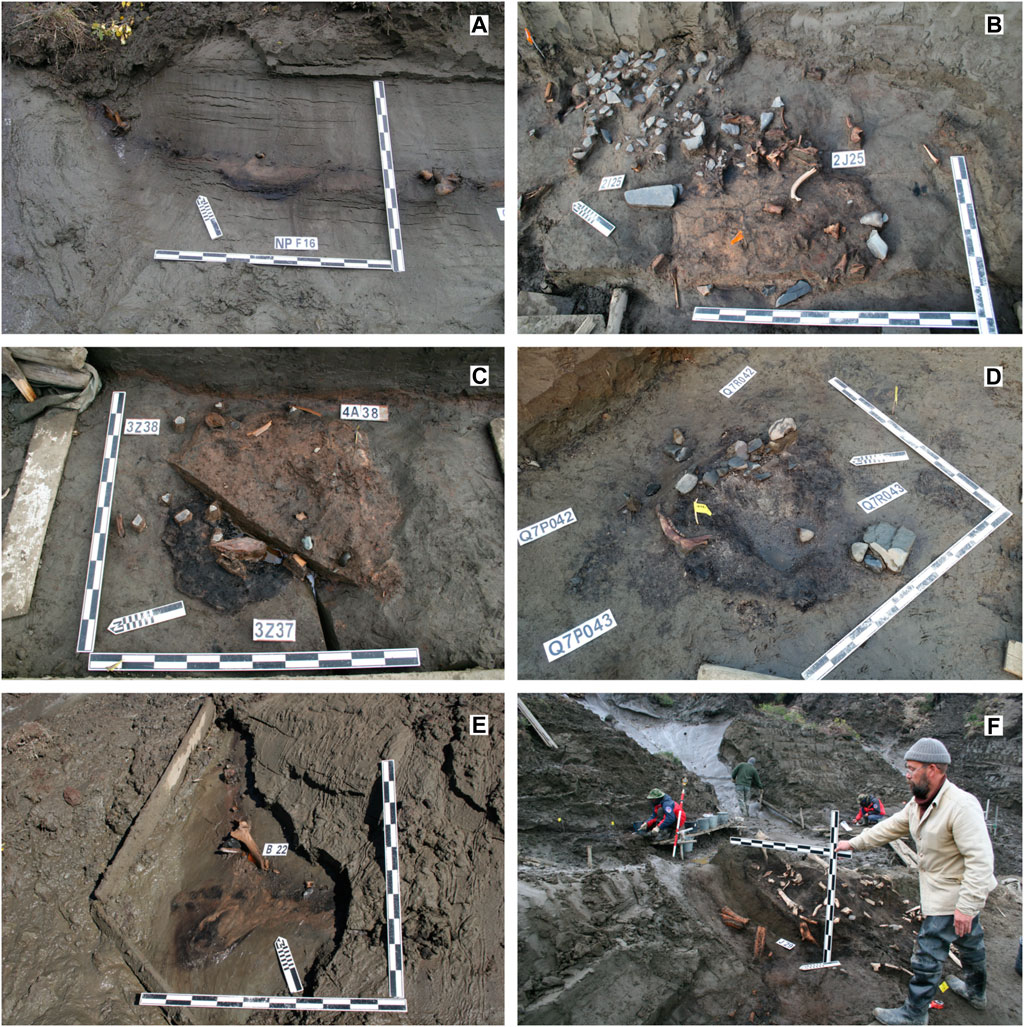
Hearth structures opened in the culture-bearing deposits of the Yana site complex.

The Yana stone industry is flake-based, using a simple knapping technology. Blades are rare and microblades are absent. Large tools are mostly unifacial or incomplete bifaces. Among thousands of stone artifacts, no stone hunting tools have been discovered at the Yana site. Instead, hunting tools seem to have been made from bone and ivory. A variety of other stone tools have been found at the site, however, including chopping tools, scrapers, chisel-like tools, and a hammer stone.

Organic materials are well-preserved at the site due to the permafrost. Around 2,500 bone and ivory artefacts have been discovered at the site between 2002 and 2016. These include a rhinoceros horn foreshaft and two mammoth ivory foreshafts, which may have been straightened with a shaft-wrench, combined with heating or steaming. The foreshafts are said to be similar to those of the Clovis culture, and are the earliest examples of bi-beveled osseous rods, and also the only example found outside the Americas. There are also numerous ivory utensils, bone and ivory points, bone needles, a punch or an awl made from wolf bone, decorations and personal ornaments, and hunting weapons.

Non-local materials, including amber, were used to manufacture ornaments such as pendants, suggesting that the Yana population was highly mobile or connected to extensive trade networks.

Over 1,500 beads, some painted with red ochre, have been discovered at the site. These include rounded mammoth ivory beads and tubular beads made from Pleistocene hare bone. Pendants were found made from reindeer teeth and herbivore incisors, and occasionally carnivore canines, or more rarely from minerals such as amber, as well as one specimen made from anthraxolite shaped like a horse or mammoth head. Ivory hair band ornaments are also found. Three-dimensional objects are less common, but include 19 antler animal figurines, probably intended to represent mammoths, three ornamented ivory vessels, and two engraved mammoth tusks, possibly engraved with drawings of hunters or dancers.

The extent and density of the finds indicate a sustained and long-term human occupation of the site, and demonstrate a high level of cultural and technological development.

== Relationship to other cultures ==
Archaeologists have noted similarities between the Yana RHS and the Clovis culture, especially their respective stone industries and distinctive spear foreshafts.

== Archaeogenetics ==
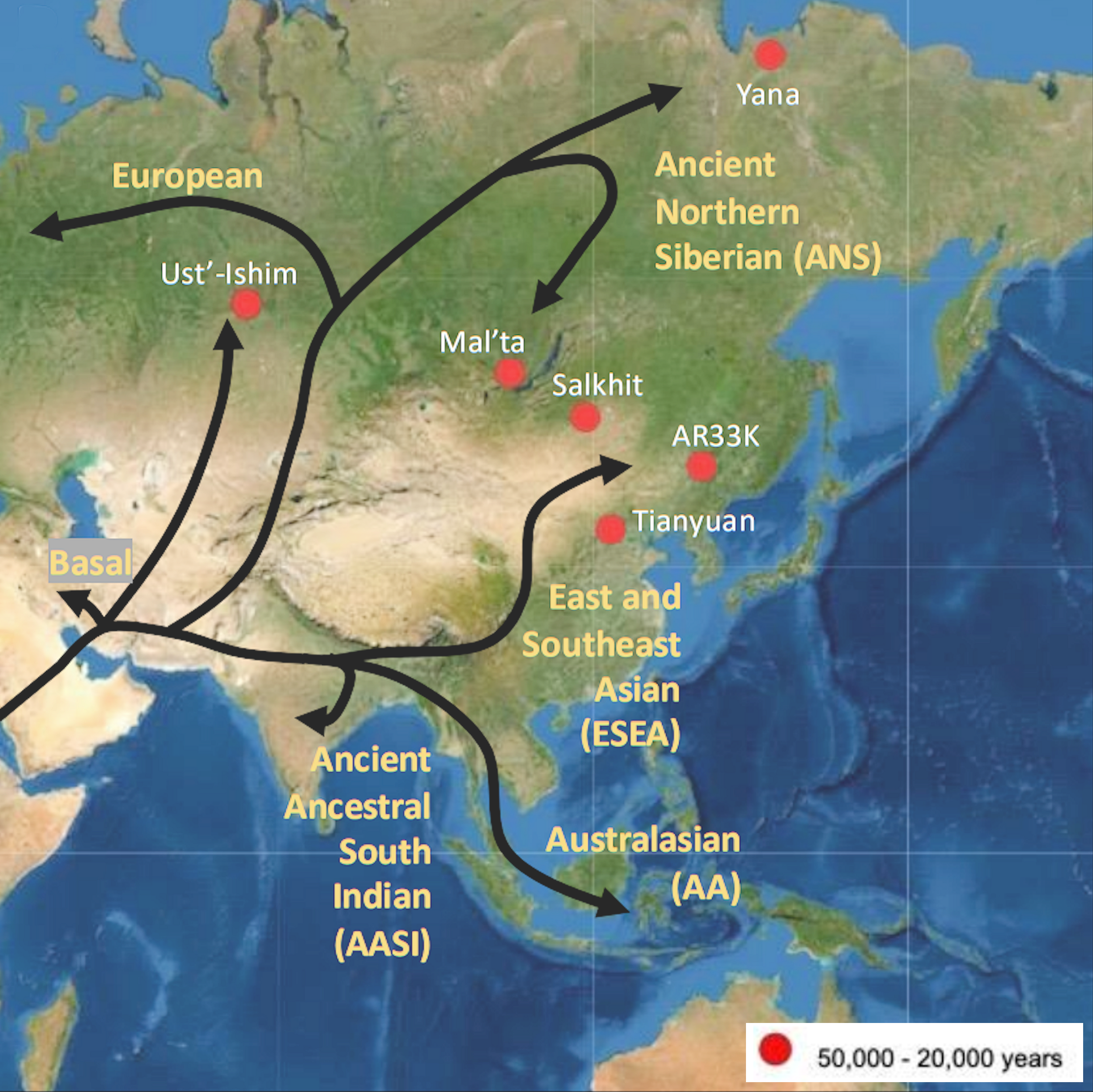
A model of differentiation after dispersal out of Africa in the Early Upper Paleolithic (45,000–20,000 years) ("The tree diagram shows divergence patterns and is not meant to depict migration routes from the branches or geographic origins of ancestral populations").

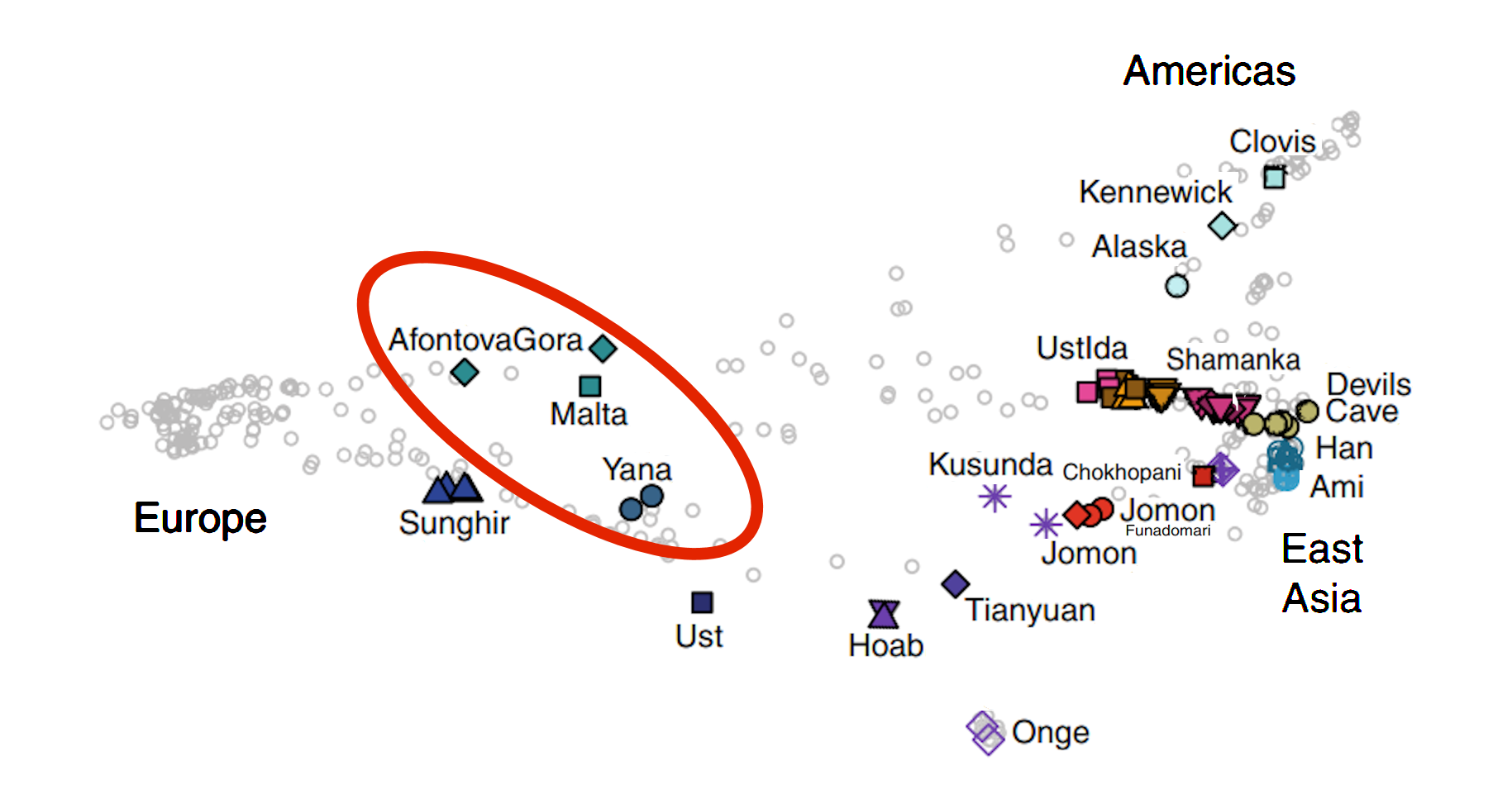
Genetic proximity of Yana with Ancient North Eurasian populations (Mal'ta, Afontova Gora), but also Ust-Ishim and Sunghir and to a lesser extent Tianyuan, within a principal component analysis of ancient and present-day individuals from worldwide populations.

Human teeth, dated to around 31,630 calibrated years before present, were found at the site, at the Northern Point locality. DNA extracted from two of these teeth, which came from two unrelated males, were found to represent a distinct archaeogenetic lineage in a study by Sikora et al. (2019), which they named Ancient North Siberians (ANS). This lineage can be modelled as a descendant of early West Eurasians (Kostenki-14-related), with significant admixture (c. 22% to 50%) from early East Asians (Tianyuan-related). The Yana population is estimated to have split from Early West Eurasians around 38,000 years ago. (Note: Sikora et al. (2019) model the Yana individuals as 22% East Eurasian and the remainder West Eurasian ("Using admixture graphs and outgroup-based estimation of mixture proportions, we find that ANS can be modelled as early West Eurasian with an approximately 22% contribution from early East Asians"). Massilani et al. (2020) model the Yana individuals as around one-third East Eurasian and two-thirds West Eurasian. Vallini et al. (2022) model Yana as 50% West Eurasian and 50% East Eurasian.)

Both individuals from the Yana site were found to belong to mitochondrial haplogroup U, and Y chromosome haplogroup P1.
