= Yunnan Jinding Zinc =

Subsidiary of Sichuan Hongda

Yunnan Jinding Zinc Corporation Ltd., founded in 2003, is a subsidiary of Sichuan Hongda, a larger mining firm which itself is a subsidiary of the Hanlong Group. It operates a mine and smelter near Jinding in Lanping County, Yunnan with an annual capacity of over 100,000 tons of zinc.

== Pollution ==
The firms smelter operations are near residential housing in Jinding and other villages, which has resulted in high levels of lead, zinc, and cadmium in the soil surrounding the plant and high levels of lead in the blood of residents. Environmental enforcement efforts by the Chinese and Yunnan governments have been ineffective. High levels of lead in household dust was found in residences in the area. Lead in household dust is one way lead is ingested by children.
