= Afontova Gora =

Paleolithic archeological culture

- Location of Afontova Gora
- Geographical range: Siberia
- Period: Late Upper Paleolithic; Mesolithic
- Dates: c. 18,000-12,000 BP
- Preceded by: Mal'ta–Buret' culture
- Followed by: Afanasievo culture Okunevo culture

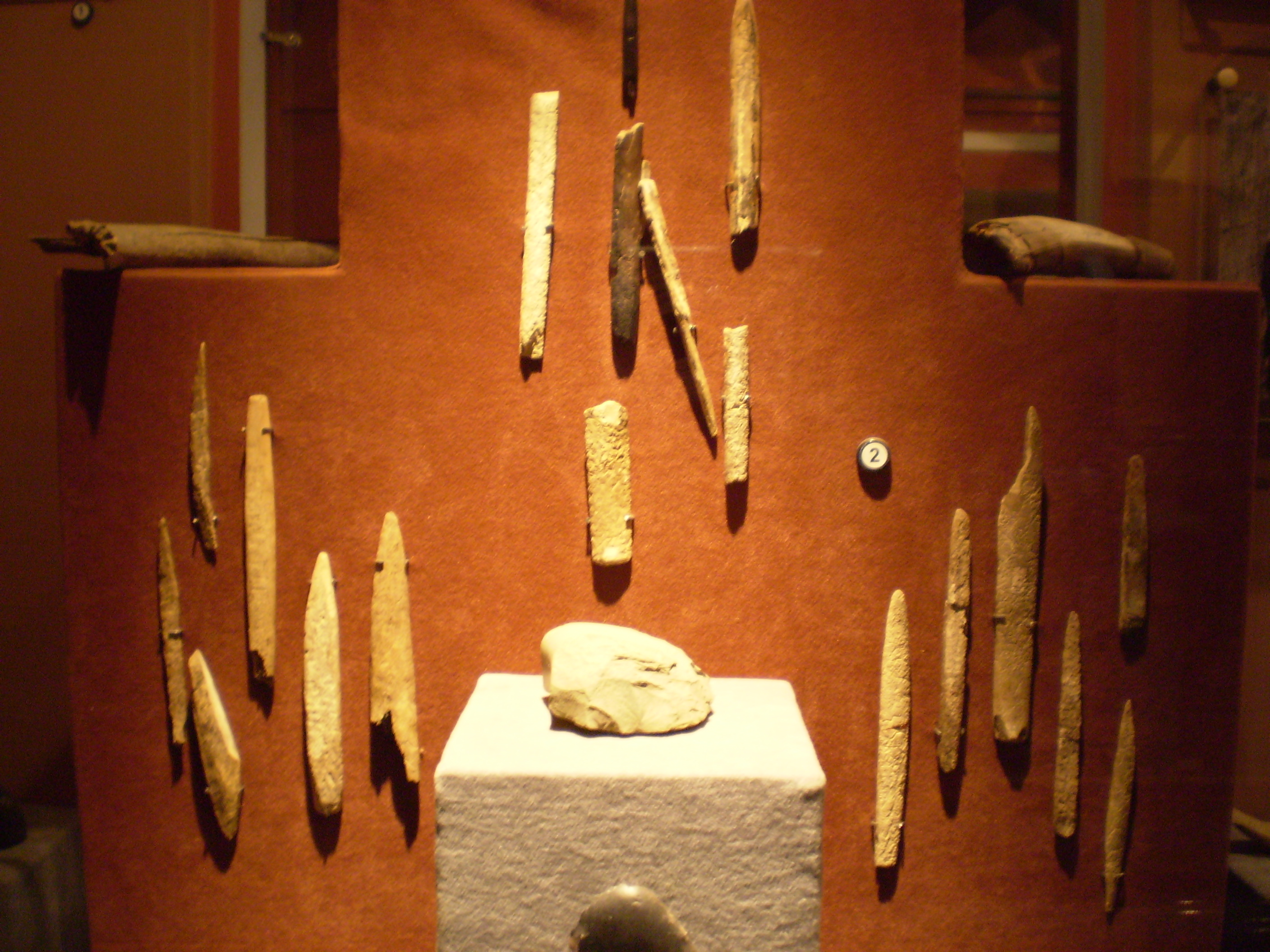
Tools from Afontova Gora in the Krasnoyarsk Regional Museum

Afontova Gora (Russian: Афонтова гора, "Afont Mountain") is a Late Upper Paleolithic and Mesolithic Siberian complex of archaeological sites located on the left bank of the Yenisey River near the city of Krasnoyarsk, Russia. Afontova Gora has cultural and genetic links to the people from Mal'ta–Buret'. The complex was first excavated in 1884 by Ivan Savenkov.

The Afontova Gora complex consists of multiple stratigraphic layers, of five or more campsites. The campsites shows evidence of mammoth hunting and were likely the result of an eastward expansion of mammoth hunters. The human fossils discovered at Afontova Gora, a male and a girl dated to 17,000~15,000 years BP, were stored in the Hermitage Museum.

== Sites ==
Afontova Gora I is situated on the western bank of the Yenisey River and has yielded the remains from horse, mammoth, reindeer, steppe bison, and large canids. A canid tibia has been dated 16,900 years old and the skull has been taxonomically described as being that of a dog, but it is now lost. Its description falls outside of the range of Pleistocene or modern northern wolves.

Afontova Gora II is the site where the human fossil remains were found. The site was first excavated in 1912-1914 by V.I. Gromov. In 1924, G.P. Sosnovsky, N.K. Auerbach, and V.I. Gromov discovered the first human fossils at the site. The remains of mammoth, Arctic fox, Arctic hare, reindeer, bison, and horse were discovered at the site.

Afontova Gora II consists of 7 layers. Layer 3 from Afontova Gora II is the most significant: the layer produced the largest amount of cultural artefacts and is the layer where the human fossil remains were discovered. Over 20,000 artefacts were discovered at layer 3: this layer produced over 450 tools and over 250 osseous artefacts (bone, antler, ivory). The fossils of two distinct individuals were discovered in the initial excavations: the upper premolar of an 11-15 year-old child and the left radius, ulna, humerus, phalanx, and frontal bone of an adult.

Afontova Gora III is the site where the initial excavation was undertaken by Ivan Savenkov in 1884. The site was disturbed by mining activities in the late 1880s. The site consists of 3 layers.

Afontova Gora V was discovered in 1996. The remains of hare, pika, cave lion, horse, reindeer, bison, and partridge were discovered at the site.

== Human remains ==
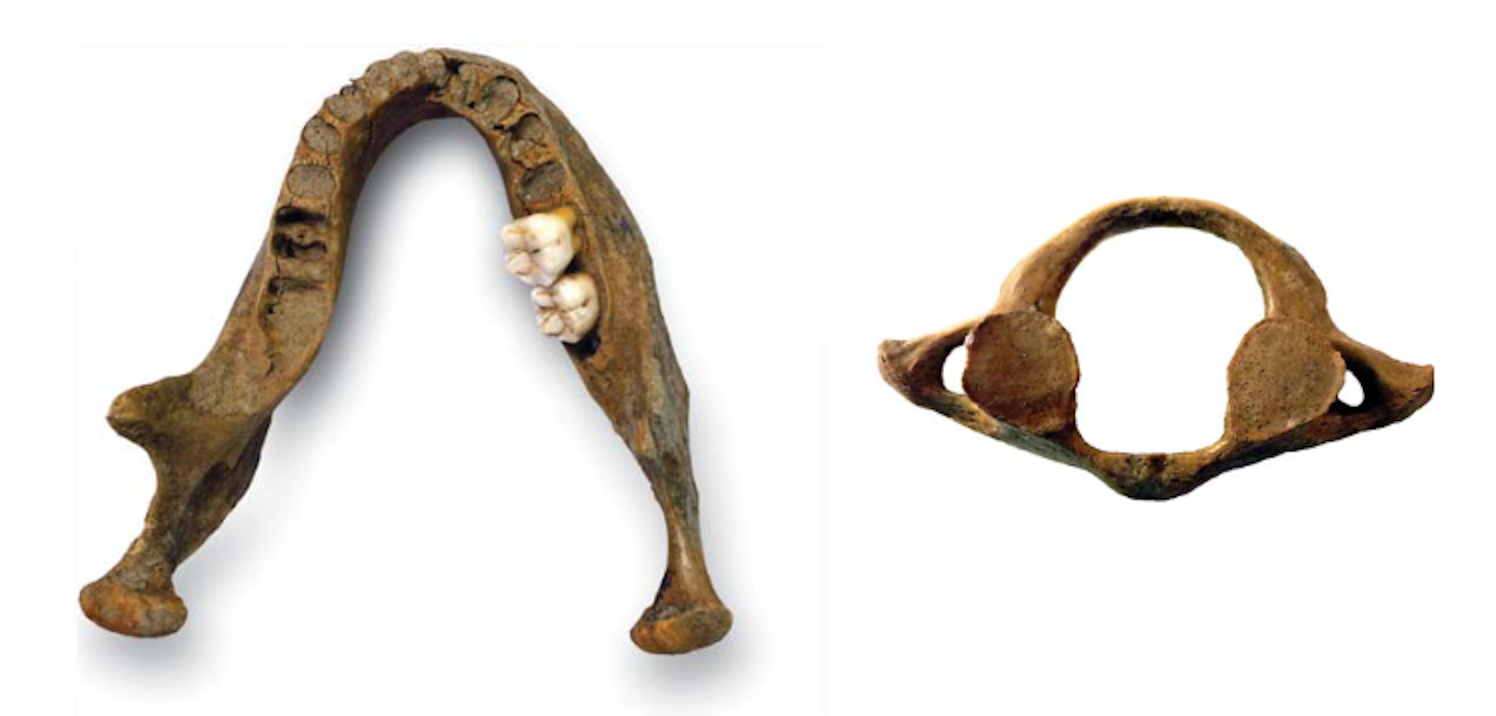
The mandibule, teeth and atlas from Afontova Gora, discovered in 2014.

The bodies of two individuals, known as Afontova Gora 2 (AG2) and Afontova Gora 3 (AG3) were discovered within the complex (the name Afontova Gora 1 refers to the remains of a canid).

=== Afontova Gora 2 ===
The human fossil remains of Afontova Gora 2 were discovered in the 1920s at Afontova Gora II and stored at the Hermitage Museum. The remains are dated to around 17,000 BP (16,930-16,490 BP).

In 2009, researchers visited the Hermitage Museum and extracted DNA from the humerus of Afontova Gora 2. Despite significant contamination, researchers succeeded in extracting low coverage genomes. DNA analysis confirmed that the individual was male.

The individual showed close genetic affinities to Mal'ta 1 (Mal'ta boy). Afontova Gora 2 also showed greater genetic affinity for the Karitiana people than for the Han Chinese. Around 1.9-2.7% of the genome was Neanderthal in origin.

Afontova Gora 2 belong to the Y-DNA haplogroup Q1a1-F746, an uniparental genetic marker that is infrequently observed in modern populations.

=== Afontova Gora 3 ===
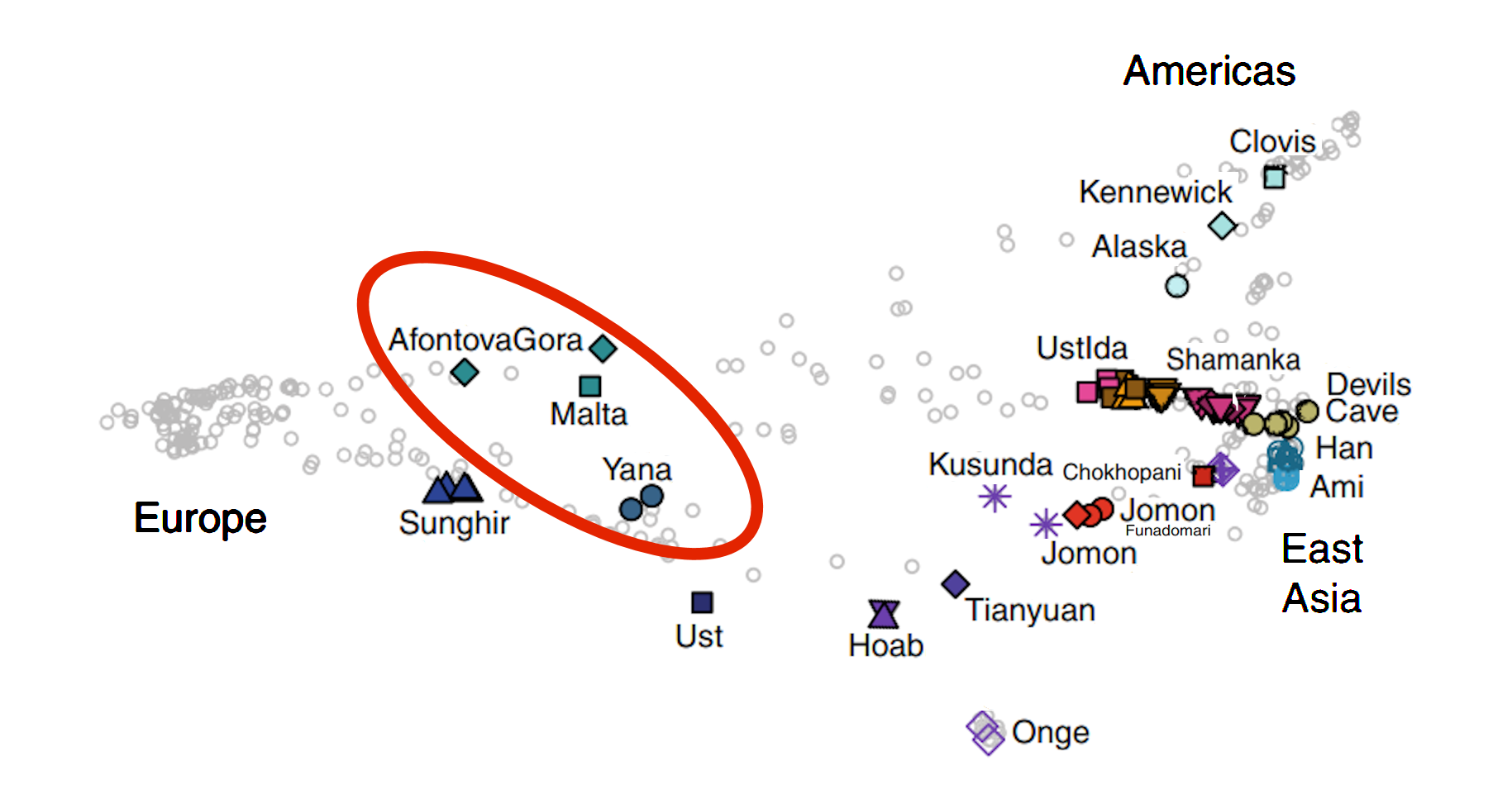
Genetic proximity of Afontova Gora with other Ancient North Eurasian populations (Mal'ta and Yana), within a principal component analysis of ancient and present-day individuals from worldwide populations.

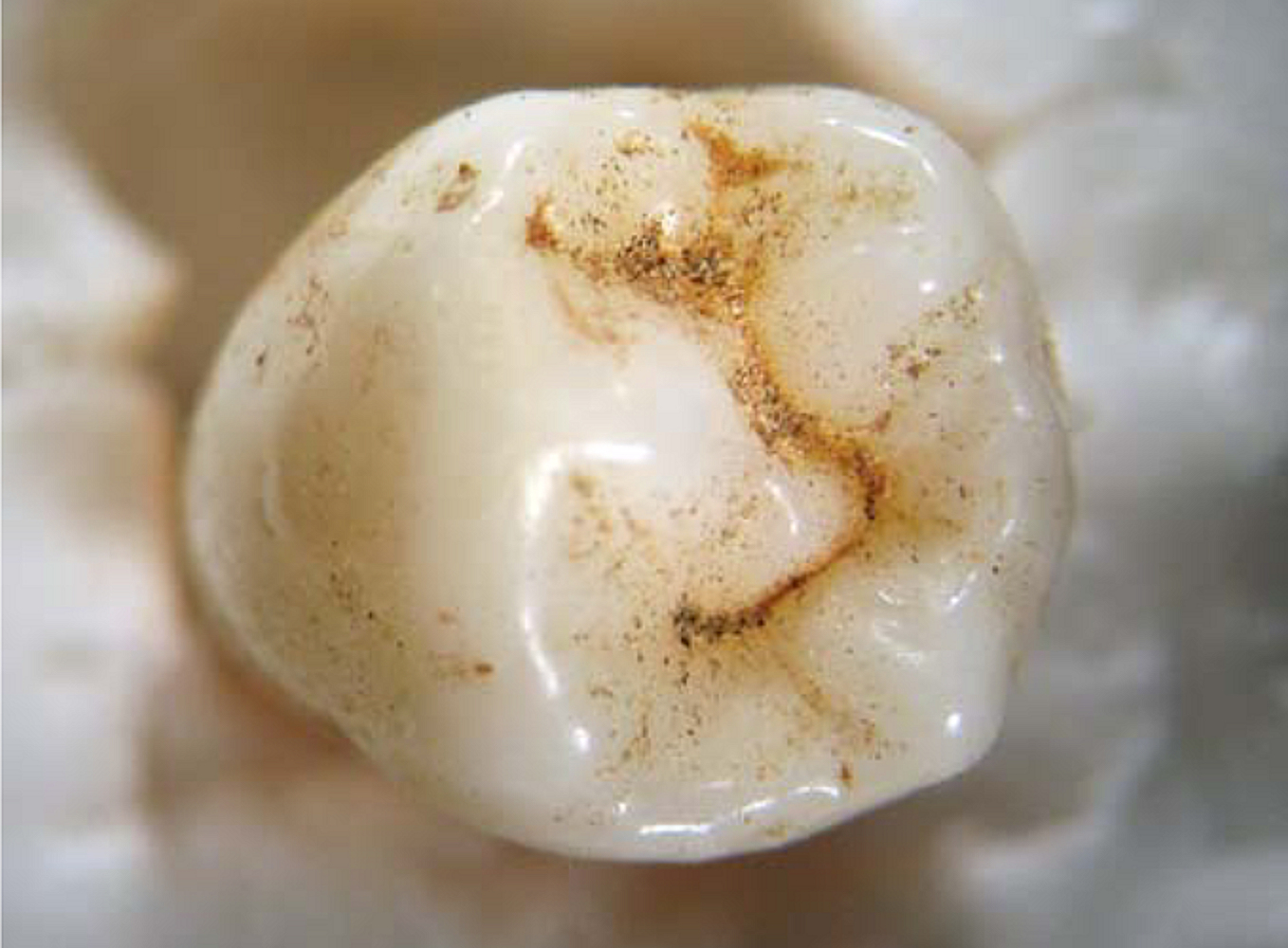
One of the five Afontova Gora teeth of individual Afontova Gora 3 (AG3), dated circa 16,090 cal BC.

In 2014, more human fossil remains were discovered at Afontova Gora II during salvage excavation before the construction of a new bridge over the Yenesei River. The remains belonged to two different females: the atlas of an adult female and the mandible and five lower teeth of a teenage girl (Afontova Gora 3) estimated to be around 14–15 years old. Initially, the new findings were presumed to be roughly contemporaneous with Afontova Gora 2. In 2017, direct AMS dating revealed that Afontova Gora 3 is dated to around 16,090 cal BC).

The mandible of Afontova Gora 3 was described as being gracile.

Researchers analyzing the dental morphology of Afontova Gora 3 concluded that the teeth showed distinct characteristics with most similarities to another fossil (the Listvenka child) from the Altai-Sayan region and were neither western nor eastern. Afontova Gora 3 and Listvenka showed distinct dental characteristics that were also different from other Siberian fossils, including those from Mal'ta.

DNA was extracted from one of the teeth of Afontova Gora 3 and analyzed. Compared to Afontova Gora 2, researchers were able to obtain higher coverage genomes from Afontova Gora 3. DNA analysis confirmed that the individual was female. mtDNA analysis revealed that Afontova Gora 3 belonged to the mitochondrial Haplogroup R1b. Around 2.9-3.7% of the genome was Neanderthal in origin.

In a 2016 study, researchers determined that Afontova Gora 2, Afontova Gora 3, and Mal'ta 1 (Mal'ta boy) shared common descent and were clustered together in a Mal'ta cluster. Genetically, Afontova Gora 3 is not closer to Afontova Gora 2 when compared to Mal'ta 1. When compared to Mal'ta 1, the Afontova Gora 3 lineage apparently contributed more to modern humans and is genetically closer to Native Americans.

==== Blond hair ====
Phenotypic analysis shows that Afontova Gora 3 carries the derived rs12821256 allele associated with, and likely causal for, blond hair color, making Afontova Gora 3 the earliest individual known to carry this derived allele. The allele was found in three later members of the largely ANE-derived Eastern Hunter-Gatherers populations from Samara, Motala and Ukraine c. 10,000 BP, suggesting that it originated in the Ancient North Eurasian population before spreading to western Eurasia. The hundreds of millions of copies of this mutated alelle (a single-nucleotide polymorphism) are at the root of the classic European blond hair mutation, as massive population migrations from the Eurasian steppe, by a people who had substantial Ancient North Eurasian ancestry, entered continental Europe. (Note: "The earliest known example of the classic European blond hair mutation is in an Ancient North Eurasian from the Lake Baikal region of eastern Siberia from seventeen thousand years ago. The hundreds of millions of copies of this mutation in central and western Europe today likely derive from a massive migration of people bearing Ancient North Eurasian ancestry, an event that is related in the next chapter.")

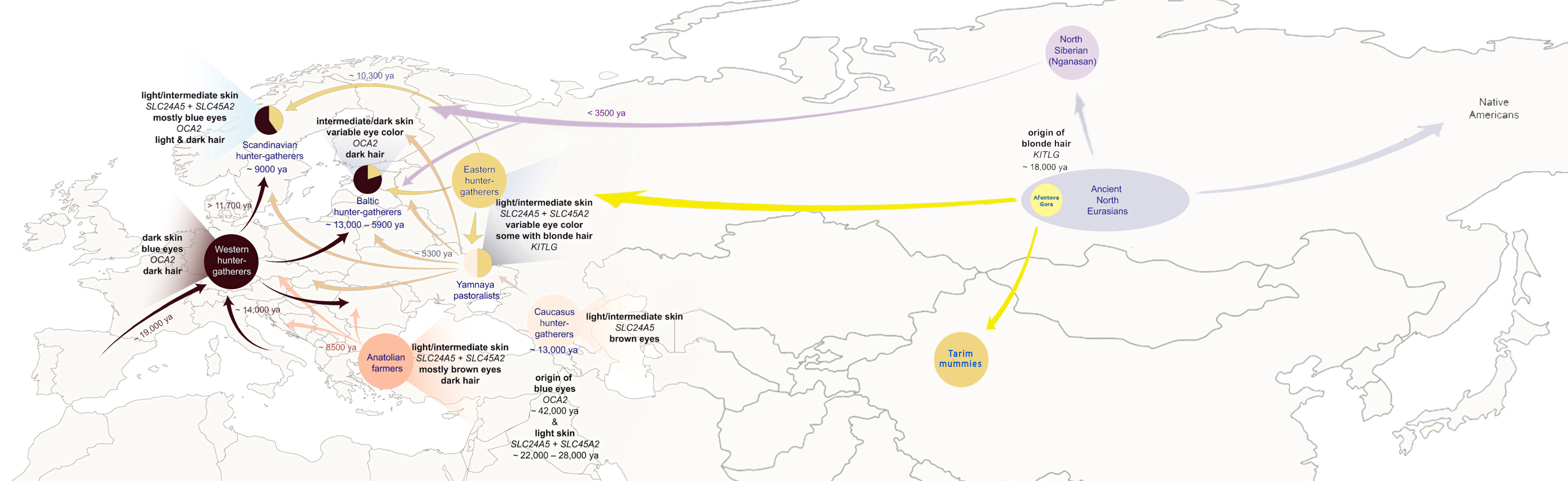
The mutation for blond hair is thought to have originated among the Afontova Gora population of the Ancient North Eurasian (ANE) cline of south-central Siberia

==== Genetic proximity of Afontova Gora 3 with the Tarim mummies ====
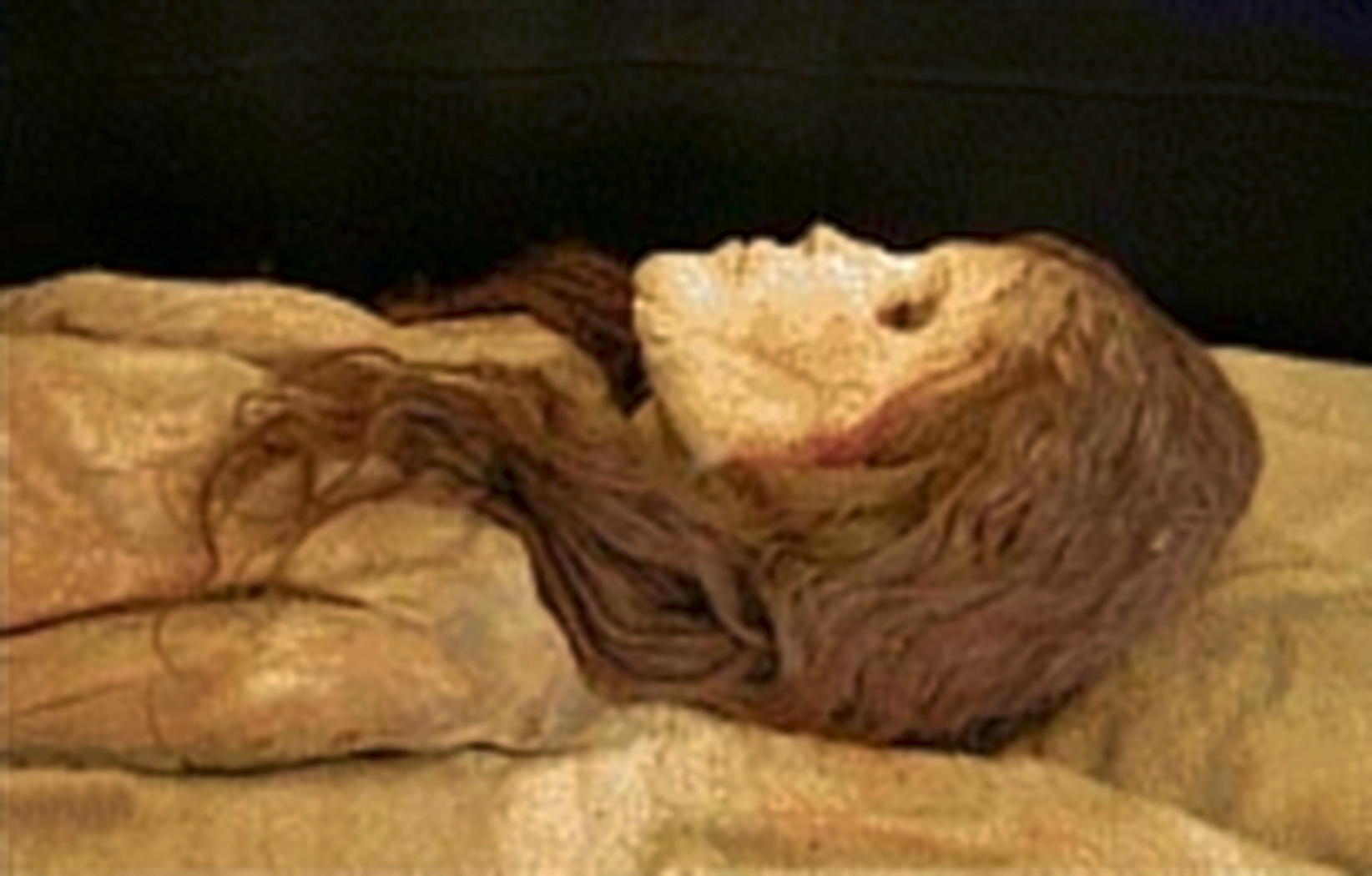
The "Princess of Xiaohe", one of the Tarim mummies

A 2021 genetic study on the Tarim mummies found that they were primarily descended from a population represented by the Afontova Gora 3 specimen (AG3), genetically displaying "high affinity" with it. The genetic profile of the Afontova Gora 3 individual represented about 72% of the ancestry of the Tarim mummies, while the remaining 28% of their ancestry was derived from Baikal EBA (Early Bronze Age Baikal populations).

The Tarim mummies are thus one of the rare Holocene populations who derive most of their ancestry from the Ancient North Eurasians (ANE, specifically the Mal'ta and Afontova Gora populations), despite their distance in time (around 14,000 years). More than any other ancient populations, they can be considered as "the best representatives" of the Ancient North Eurasians.
