= Tongtiandong =

Archaeological site in the Xinjiang Autonomous Region of China

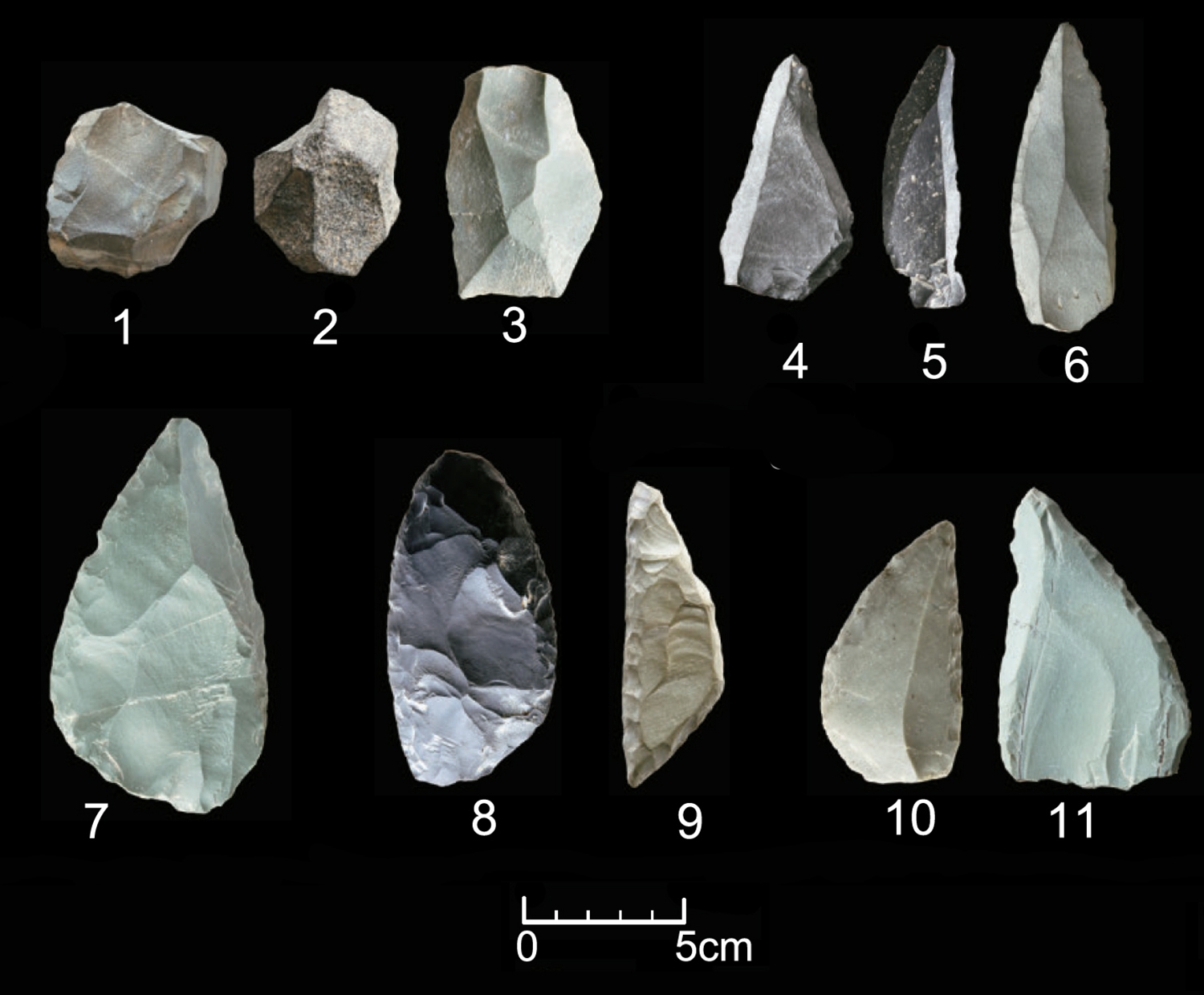
- Typical artifacts of the TMP ("Terminal Middle Paleolithic" ~50–38 ka BP) techno-complex found in the Tongtiandong Cave site of Northwest China (1: Levallois core; 2: Discoid core; 3: Levallois flake; 4,5,6: Levallois points; 7,10,11: Mousterian point; 8,9: Scraper; 1–11).

- Location in China Tongtiandong (Xinjiang)
- 47.006093°N 85.980127°E
- Periods: Paleolithic China
- Region: Xinjian China

History
- Built: 46,000–44,000 BP cal

Tongtiandong (Chinese: 通天洞, Tōngtiāndòng) is an archaeological site in the Xinjiang Autonomous Region of China, just to the south of the Altai Mountains. The site had hunter-foraging human activity circa 40,000 BP (the Mousterian cultural layer was radiocarbon dated to approximately 46,000–44,000 BP, calibrated).

== Cave ==
Until the discovery of Tongtiandong, the typical Mousterian techno-complex had not been identified in China, but the whole reduction sequence of the Mousterian techno-complex has now been identified in Tongtiandong cave.

From Tongtiandong and other sites, a general distributional pattern of different techno-complexes between Mongolia-Siberia and northern China can be established, for the dates between 50,000 and 32,000 cal BP.

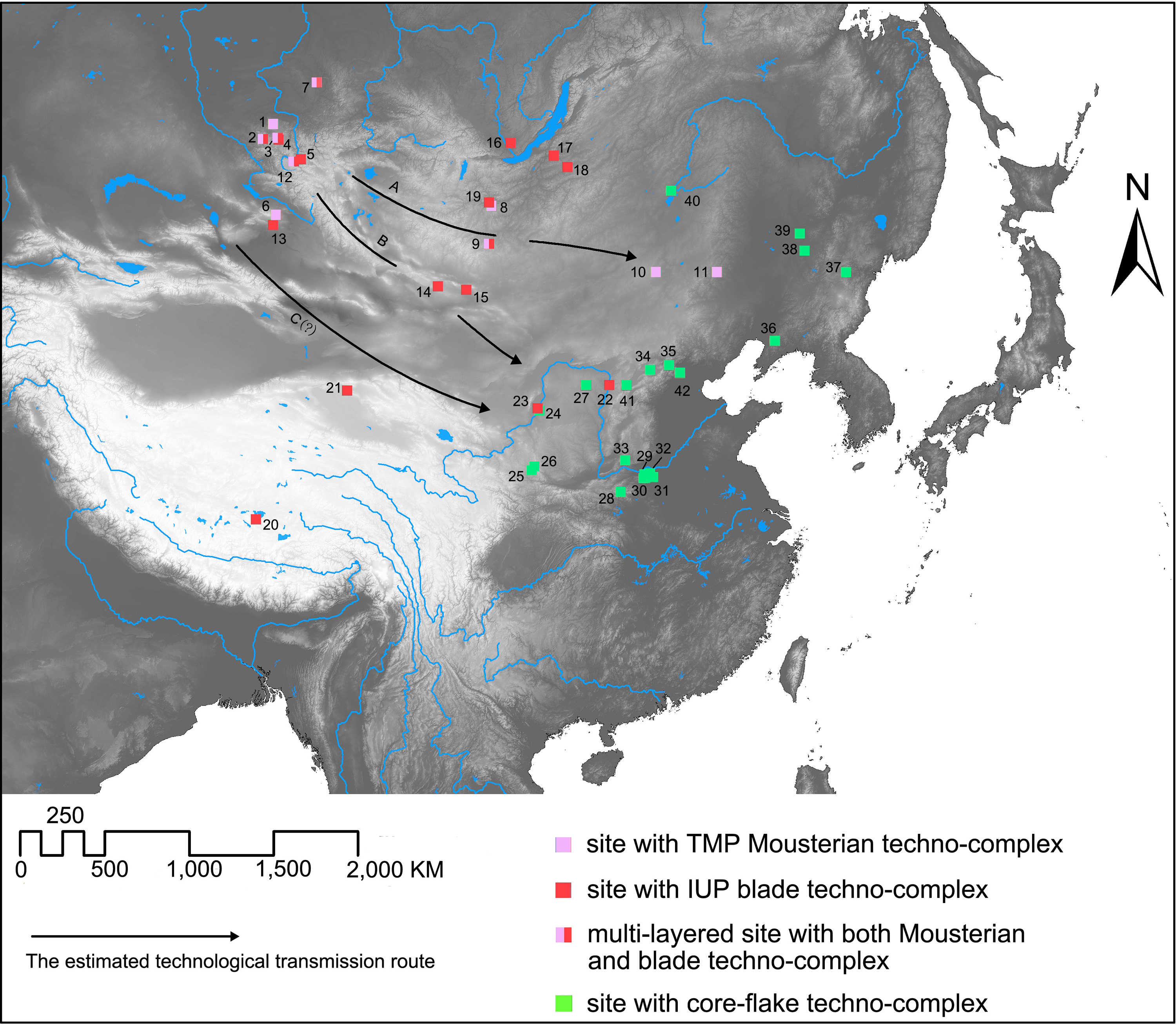
Distributional pattern of the sites with different techno-complexes and the estimated technological transmission route between Mongolia-Siberia and northern China between 50 and 32 cal ka BP. 1: Okladnikov Cave; 2: Strashnaya cave; 3: Denisova Cave; 4: Ust Karakol; 5: Kara-Tenesh; 6: Tongtiandong; 7: Mokhovo-2; 8: Kharganyn Gol-5; 9: Orkhon-1; 10: Jinsitai; 11: Sanlongdong cave; 12: Kara-Bom; 13: Luotuoshi; 14: Chikhen Agui; 15: Tsagaan Agui; 16: Voenny Hospital; 17: Kamenka; 18: Tolbaga; 19: Tolbar-4; 20: Nwya Devu; 21: Lenghu; 22: Yushuwan; 23: Lenghu-.1; 24: Shuidonggou-2; 25: Changweigou; 26: ZS08; 27: Wulanmulun; 28: Longquandong; 29: Zhijidong; 30: Fangjiagou; 31: Zhaozhuang; 32: Laonainaimiao; 33: Xiachuan (Fuyuhe); 34: Xibaimaying; 35: Xigouwan; 36: Xiaogushan; 37: Mingyuegou; 38: Zhoujiayoufang; 39: Guxiangtun; 40: Zhalainuoer; 41: Shiyu; 42: Zhoukoudian Upper Cave.

== Terminology ==
- TMP: Terminal Middle Paleolithic (~50–38 ka BP)
- IUP: Initial Upper Paleolithic (~43-32ka BP)
