= Initial Upper Paleolithic =

First stage of the Upper Paleolithic

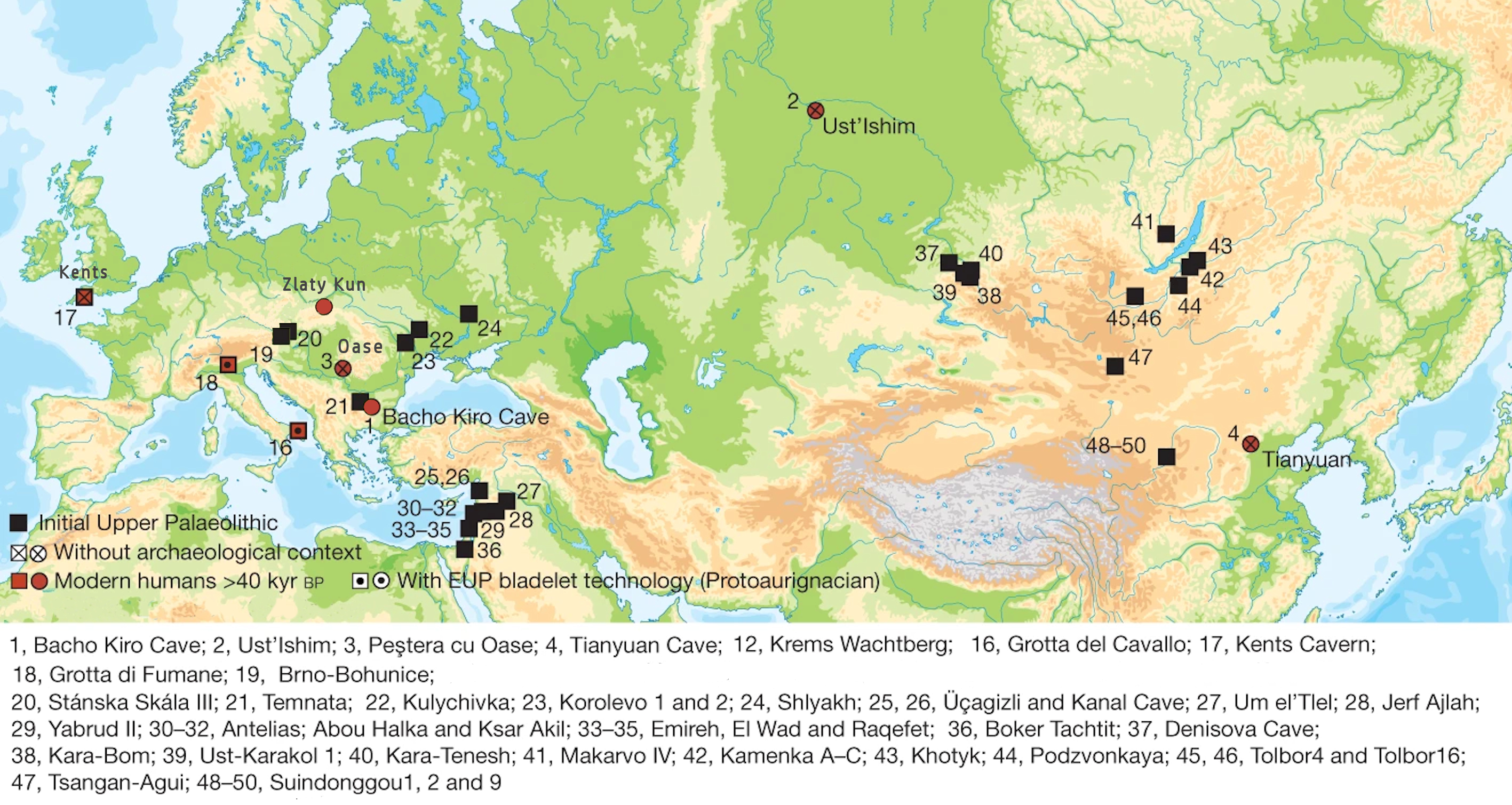
Main Initial Upper Paleolithic human remains ( ) and stone assemblage sites ( ).

The Initial Upper Paleolithic (also IUP, c. 50,000–40,000 BP) covers the first stage of the Upper Paleolithic, during which modern human populations expanded throughout Eurasia following the initial migration out of Africa.

== Technology, art, and distribution ==
The Initial Upper Paleolithic period is characterized by a broadly shared material culture and tools associated with an early modern human dispersal >45kya. These IUP tools are characterized by a combination of elements of the Levallois technique (faceted platforms, hard hammer percussion, flat-faced cores). There are broadly two major IUP-affiliated types: 'microlithic blades' (or microblades) and 'core & flakes' (or CAF assemblages). While most archaeologists agree on the existence of a shared set of traits, it remains unclear how much those can be related to a single demic diffusion event, or be explained by cultural transmission or convergence.

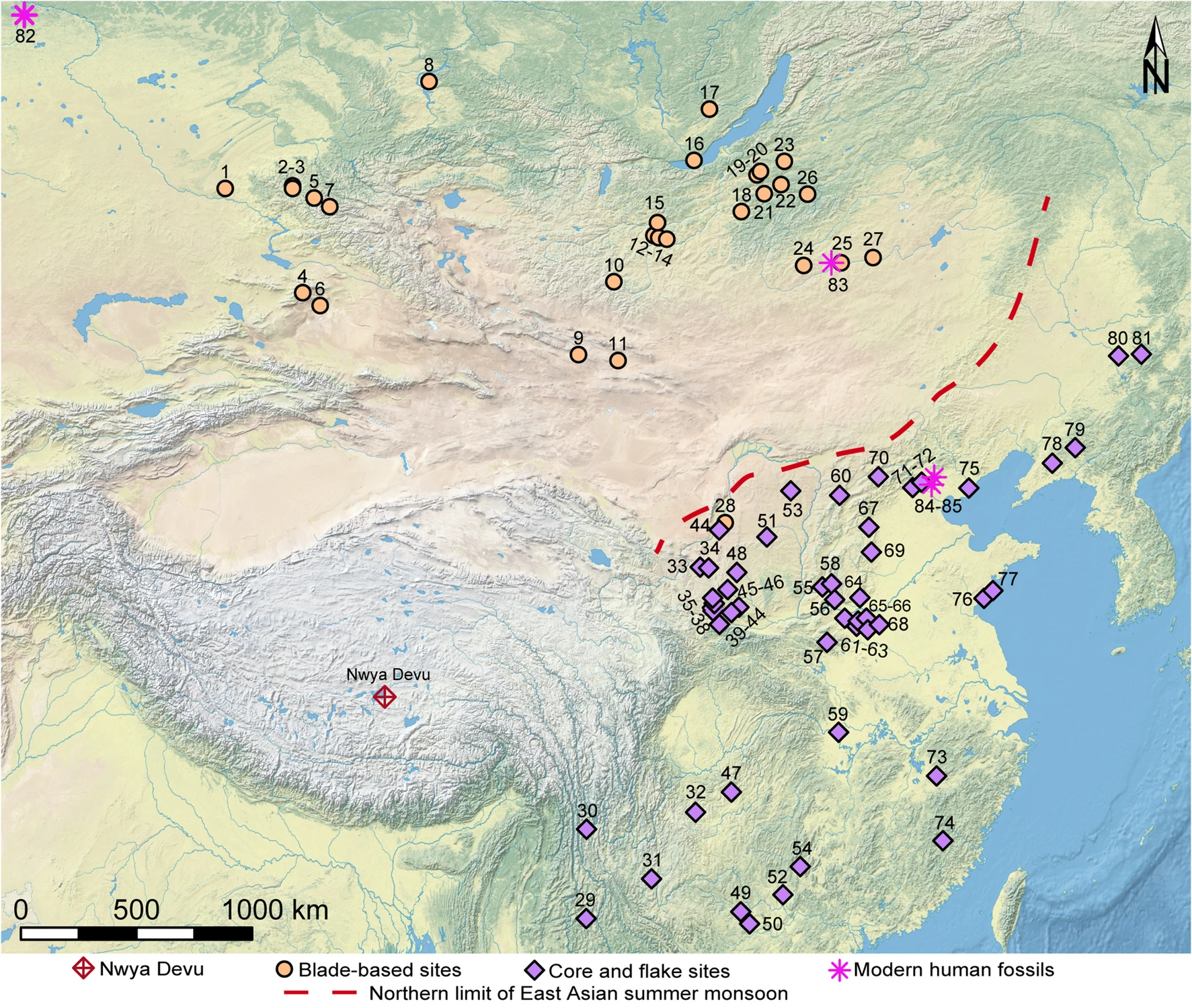
Microblade and core & flake sites in Eastern Asia

Detailed analysis of the IUP lithic assemblages from Bacho Kiro Cave (Bulgaria), a key reference site for the period, reveals that these groups practiced a curated lithic economy (sensu lithic analysis). This involved long‑distance transport of high‑quality flint blades from two main sources, up to 190 km and 130 km from Bacho Kiro Cave, respectively, indicating long-distance mobility and the transport of finished products. This was followed by intensive on‑site fragmentation and reduction using techniques such as bipolar knapping and re-flaking of implements.

The dispersal of IUP-affiliated material culture into Europe, Central Asia and Siberia as well as Northwest China may stem from a distinct migration wave than the dispersal of IUP-affiliated material culture into the South, Southeast and East Asian region as well as Oceania. While the IUP types in Europe, Central Asia and Siberia, such as the Bacho Kiro, Ust'-Ishim, and Kara-Bom sites, are primarily affiliated with microblades, the IUP-types in South, Southeast, and East Asia, as well as Oceania, such as the Tianyuan site, are primarily affiliated with core and flake tools. A distinct type of IUP-affiliated technology has also been found in Nwya Devu, a Paleolithic site on the Tibetan plateau.

In Eastern Asia the Initial Upper Paleolithic corresponds to the spread of 'core & flakes'. Although there is a sharp border between core/flake-based tools in Northern China and nearby blade-based tools in Mongolia, the Shuidonggou site displays both types, pointing to a period of contact or adaption. The 'core & flake' tools may be associated with the major source of ancestry for modern Eastern Asians, having arrived in East Asia via a southern route through South Asia into Southeast Asia and subsequently rapidly expanding northwards.

In Europe and Central Asia, the Initial Upper Paleolithic corresponds to the spread of a particular techno-complex in Eurasia, to which possibly relates the European Châtelperronian. The European IUP-affiliated Aurignacian complex (Protoaurignacian and Early Aurignacian) with its famous Cave art seems to correspond to another, later, human wave which spread through the Levant area. In effect Aurignacian (42,000-28,000 BP) layers generally postdate late Mousterian and Initial Upper Paleolithic assemblages. Aurignacian seems to have emerged out of the Initial Upper Paleolithic around 43,000 to 42,000 cal BP, in a process that is yet to be determined.

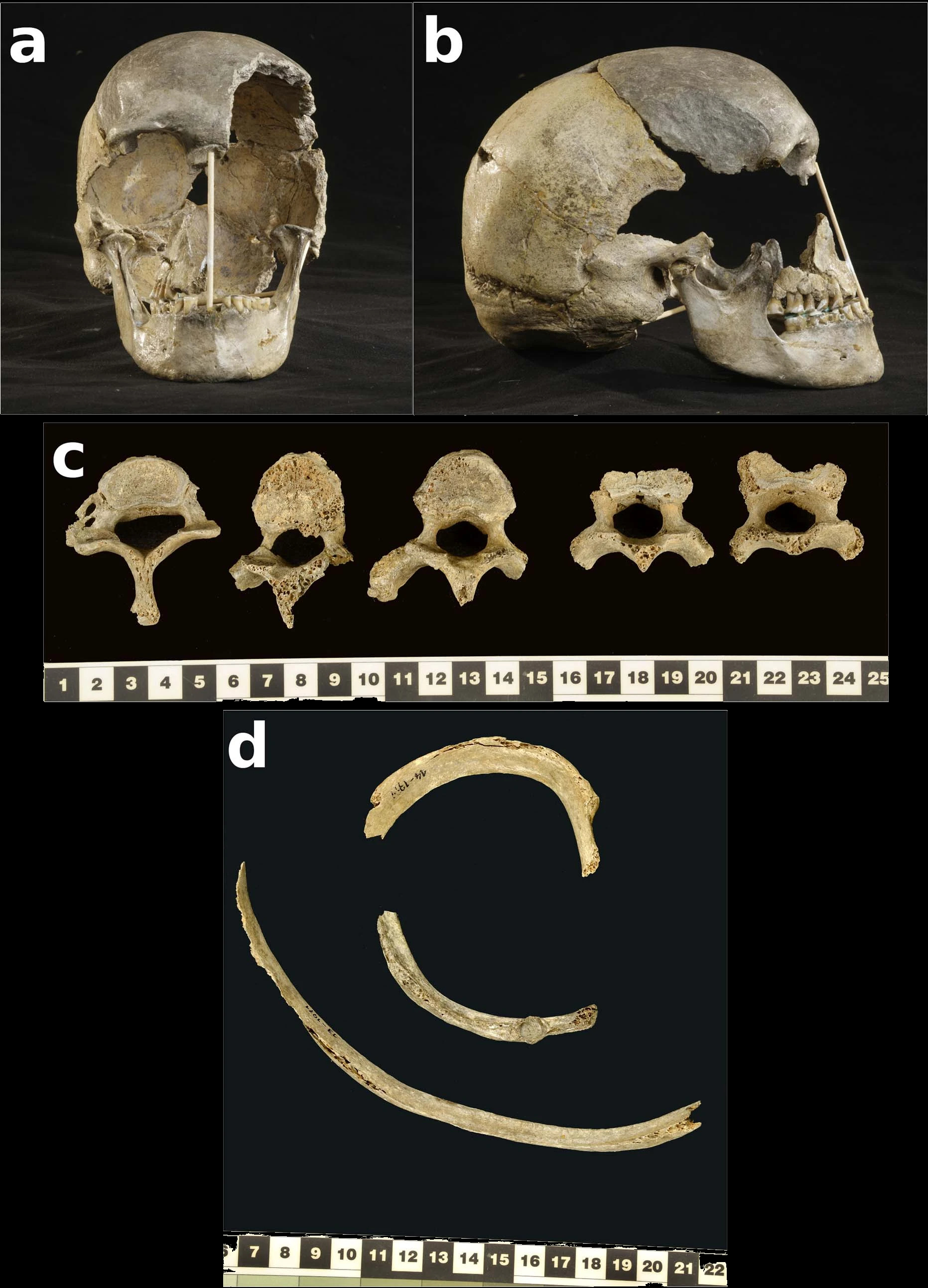
Skeletal remains from the Zlatý kůň woman

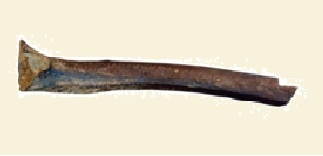
Femur from the Ust'-Ishim man

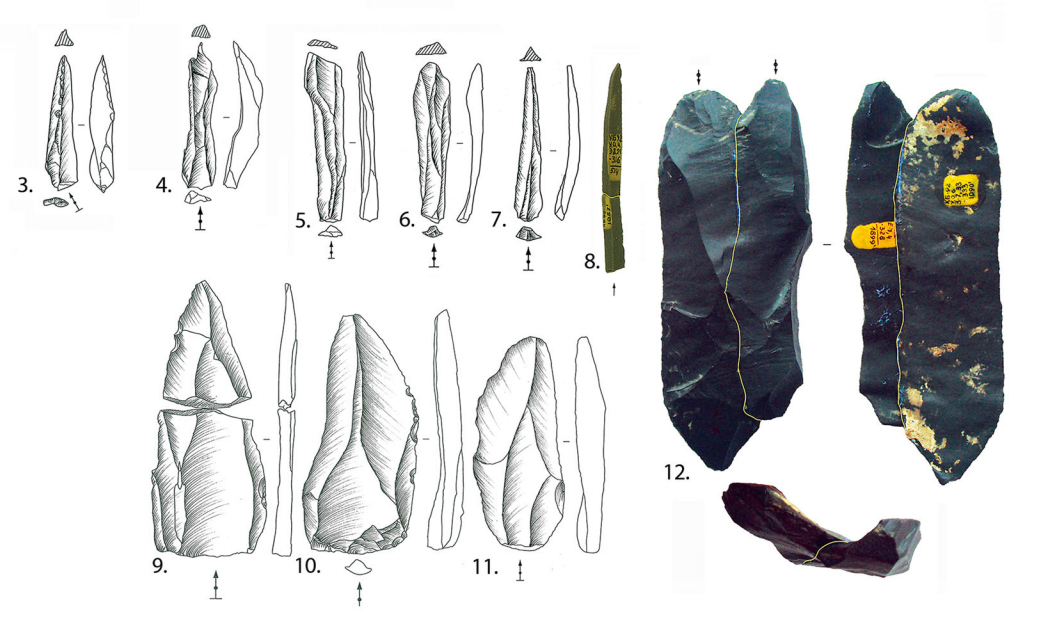
Blades from Kara-Bom, a probable Initial Upper Paleolithic site

== Archaeogenetics ==
The Initial Upper Palaeolithic was marked by the divergence between the ancestors of modern non-African human populations, with a 2024 study estimating the split between the East Eurasian branch (ancestral to modern East and Southeast Asians, Siberians and Native Americans) and West Eurasian branch (ancestral to modern Europeans and Middle Easterners) around 46,000 years ago. Tianyuan man from northern China, who unambiguously belongs to the East Eurasian branch dates to the end of the IUP, around 40,000 years ago. However, many sequenced individuals from the Initial Upper Palaeolithic belong to now extinct branches of the out of Africa population that are not closely related or ancestral to modern non-African groups.

The Neanderthal admixture event shared by all modern non-Africans is suggested to have occurred during the Initial Upper Palaeolithic, with several IUP individuals such as Oase 1 from Romania and several from Bacho Kiro Cave in Bulgaria showing evidence of distinct subsequent Neanderthal admixture events that had occurred relatively few generations prior to their lifetime.

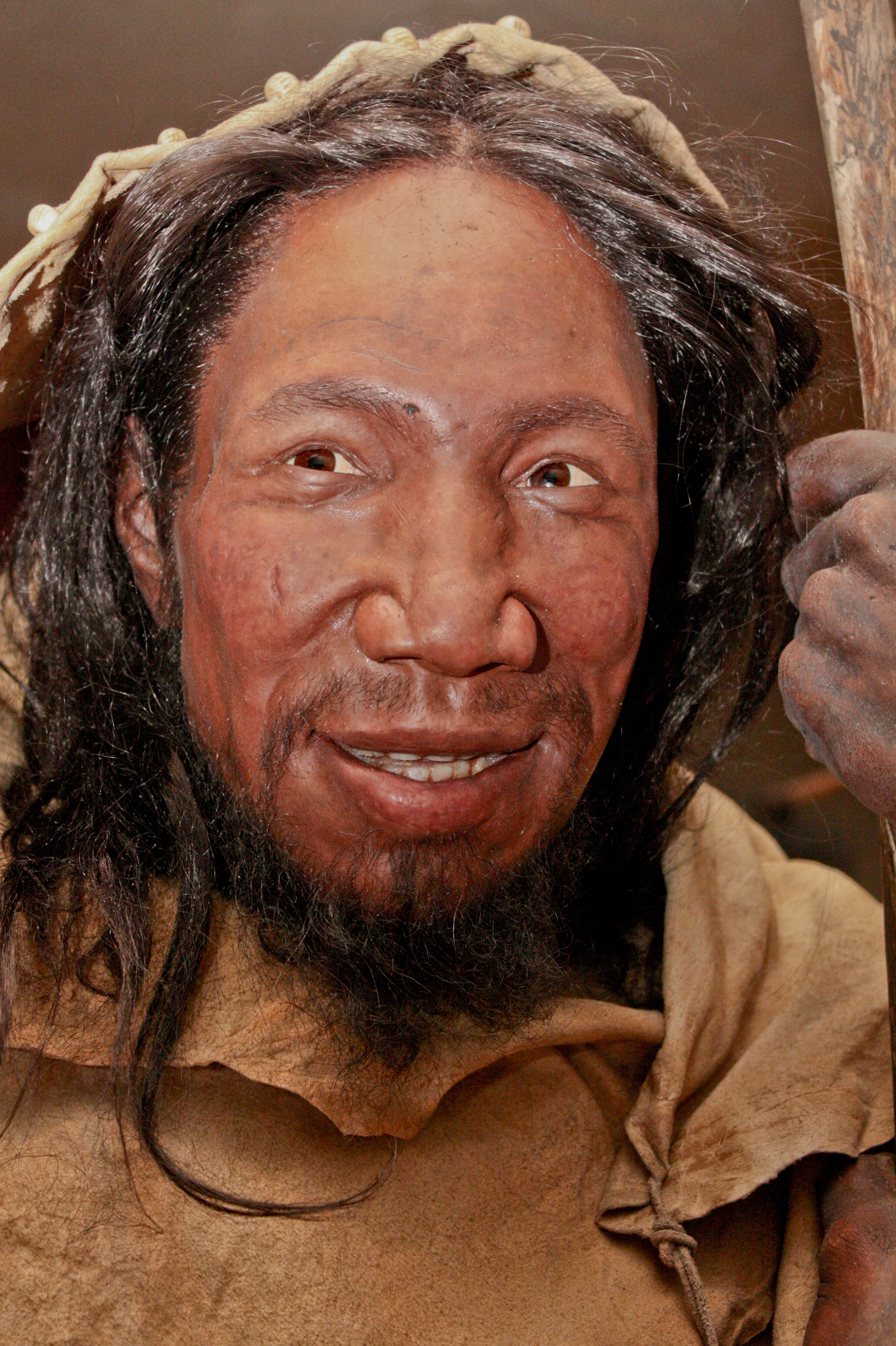
Forensic facial reconstruction of Oase 2

Among the earliest modern humans which have been directly dated to this period are:

- the Mandrin Cave remains from 56,800 and 51,700 years ago in Malataverne, France;
- the Grimaldi man from 47,000 to 41,000 years ago in Ventimiglia, Italy;
- the individual from 46,000 to 43,000 years ago in the Bacho Kiro cave, located in present-day Bulgaria;
- the Lincombian-Ranisian-Jerzmanowician culture of Central Europe, circa 45000 years ago, with Ranis cave in Germany;
- the 45,000-year-old Ust'-Ishim man (no continuity with later Eurasians);
- the 43,000-year-old Zlatý kůň woman (no continuity with later Eurasians);
- the Tianyuan man, circa 40,000 BP, who is more closely related to modern Asians and Native Americans;
- Oase 1, Oase 2 (no shared ancestry with later Eurasians);
- Fumane 2, circa 40,000 BP.

These individuals (except Tianyuan) did not contribute substantially to modern humans, although showing some similarities with modern Siberian people, but from around 37,000 a new wave of modern humans emerged, creating a single founder population, which became ancestral to modern Europeans, exemplified by individuals such as Kostenki-14.

Other studies suggest that some IUP-affiliated populations contributed some ancestry to later Upper Paleolithic Europeans associated with the Aurignacian culture and to a lesser extent, the Gravettian culture.

== Sources ==
- Prüfer, Kay; Posth, Cosimo; Yu, He; Stoessel, Alexander; Spyrou, Maria A.; Deviese, Thibaut; Mattonai, Marco; Ribechini, Erika; Higham, Thomas; Velemínský, Petr; Brůžek, Jaroslav; Krause, Johannes (June 2021). "A genome sequence from a modern human skull over 45,000 years old from Zlatý kůň in Czechia". Nature Ecology & Evolution. 5 (6): 820–825. Bibcode:2021NatEE...5..820P. doi:10.1038/s41559-021-01443-x. ISSN 2397-334X. PMC 8175239. PMID 33828249.
- Hajdinjak, Mateja; Mafessoni, Fabrizio; Skov, Laurits; Vernot, Benjamin; Hübner, Alexander; Fu, Qiaomei; Essel, Elena; Nagel, Sarah; Nickel, Birgit; Richter, Julia; Moldovan, Oana Teodora; Constantin, Silviu; Endarova, Elena; Zahariev, Nikolay; Spasov, Rosen; Welker, Frido; Smith, Geoff M.; Sinet-Mathiot, Virginie; Paskulin, Lindsey; Fewlass, Helen; Talamo, Sahra; Rezek, Zeljko; Sirakova, Svoboda; Sirakov, Nikolay; McPherron, Shannon P.; Tsanova, Tsenka; Hublin, Jean-Jacques; Peter, Benjamin M.; Meyer, Matthias; Skoglund, Pontus; Kelso, Janet; Pääbo, Svante (April 2021). "Initial Upper Palaeolithic humans in Europe had recent Neanderthal ancestry". Nature. 592 (7853): 253–257. Bibcode:2021Natur.592..253H. doi:10.1038/s41586-021-03335-3. ISSN 1476-4687. PMC 8026394. PMID 33828320.
