= Tolbaga =

Archaeological site, located south of Lake Baikal

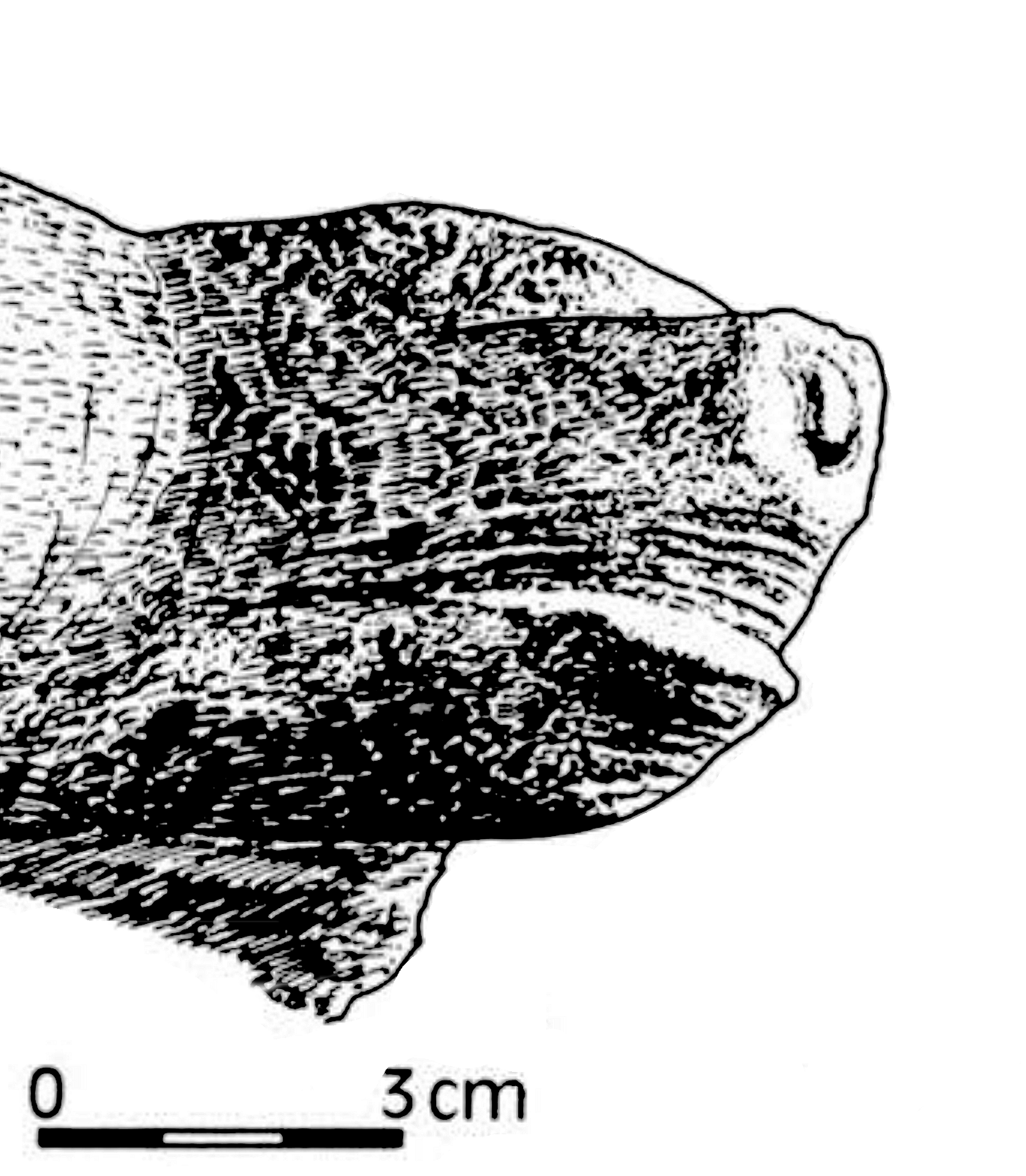
- Tolbaga, sculpted head of a bear, c. 34,860 BP

- Location in Continental Asia Tolbaga (Russia)
- 51.5°N 108.5°E
- Periods: Paleolithic

History
- Built: 34,000–27,000 BP cal

Tolbaga is an archaeological site, located south of Lake Baikal, on the right bank of the Khilok river. It was excavated by Okladnikov circa 1970. The site is dated from bones to 34,860 ± 2100 BP and 27,210 ± 300 BP.

The site is especially known for a three-dimensional naturalistic sculpture of an animal head (probably a bear), carved from the projection of the second vertebra of a woolly rhinoceros (Coelodonta antiquitatis). The sculpture has microscopic toolmarks, indicating that it was made with stone tools. The date of the sculpture is probably 34,860 ± 2100 BP, which who place it among the earliest known example of naturalistic sculpture in the world.

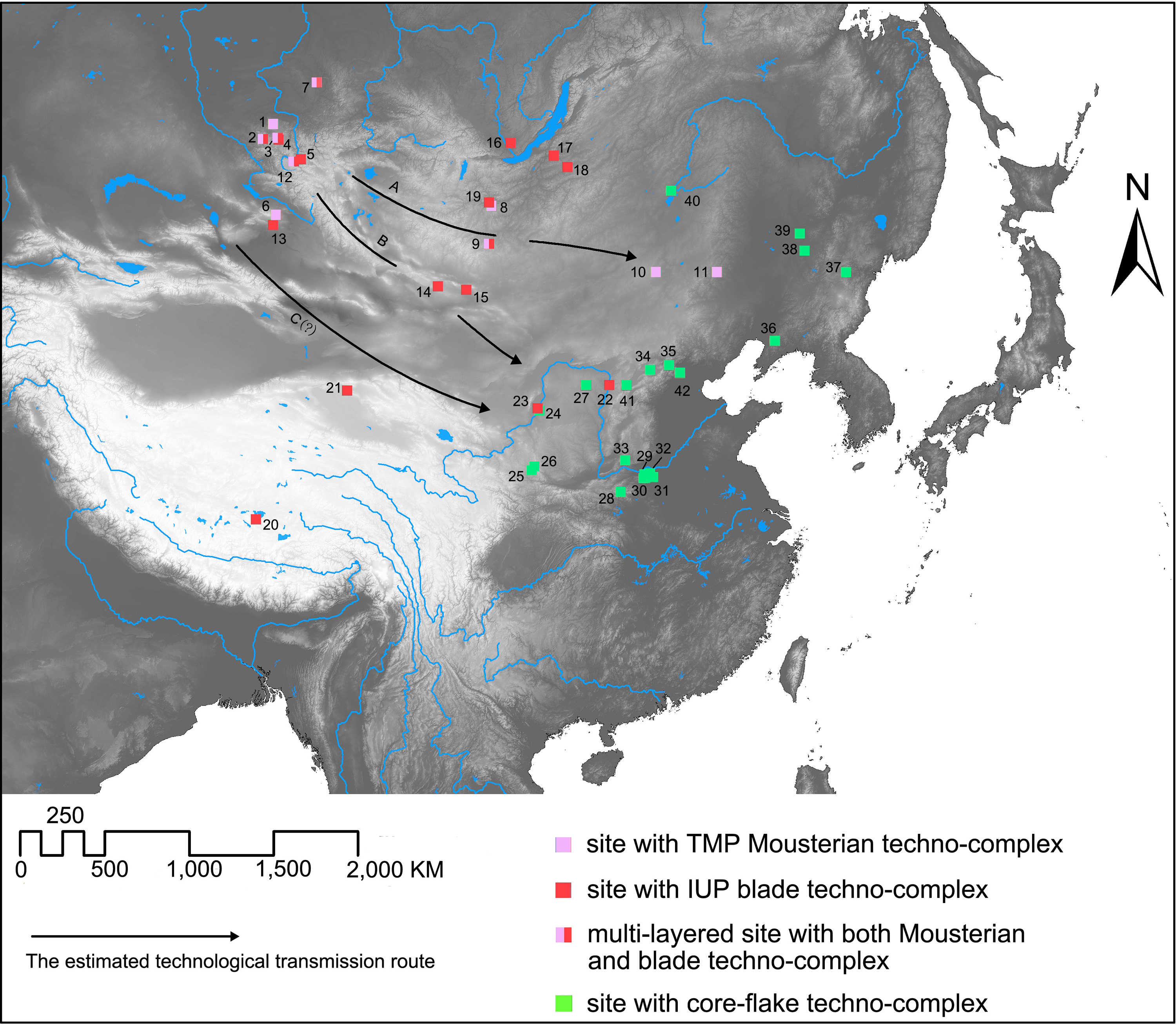
Tolbaga (18) is part of a distributional pattern of the sites with different techno-complexes and the estimated technological transmission route between Mongolia-Siberia and northern China between 50 and 32 cal ka BP. 1: Okladnikov Cave; 2: Strashnaya cave; 3: Denisova Cave; 4: Ust Karakol; 5: Kara-Tenesh; 6: Tongtiandong; 7: Mokhovo-2; 8: Kharganyn Gol-5; 9: Orkhon-1; 10: Jinsitai; 11: Sanlongdong cave; 12: Kara-Bom; 13: Luotuoshi; 14: Chikhen Agui; 15: Tsagaan Agui; 16: Voenny Hospital; 17: Kamenka; 18: Tolbaga; 19: Tolbar-4; 20: Nwya Devu; 21: Lenghu; 22: Yushuwan; 23: Lenghu-.1; 24: Shuidonggou-2; 25: Changweigou; 26: ZS08; 27: Wulanmulun; 28: Longquandong; 29: Zhijidong; 30: Fangjiagou; 31: Zhaozhuang; 32: Laonainaimiao; 33: Xiachuan (Fuyuhe); 34: Xibaimaying; 35: Xigouwan; 36: Xiaogushan; 37: Mingyuegou; 38: Zhoujiayoufang; 39: Guxiangtun; 40: Zhalainuoer; 41: Shiyu; 42: Zhoukoudian Upper Cave.
