= Ishimsky =

Ishimsky (masculine), Ishimskaya (feminine), or Ishimskoye (neuter) may refer to:

- Ishimsky District, a district of Tyumen Oblast, Russia
- Ishim, Tyumen Oblast, a town in Russia

== See also ==
- Ishim (disambiguation)
- Ust-Ishimsky District, Omsk Oblast, Russia
- Ishimsky Uyezd, Tobolsk Governorate, Russian Empire
