= Haplogroup K2a =

Haplogroup K2a may refer to:

- Haplogroup K2a (Y-DNA)
- Haplogroup K2a (mtDNA), a subclade of Haplogroup K (mtDNA)
