= Haplogroup K2a1 =

Haplogroup K2a1 may refer to:

- a subclade of Haplogroup K (mtDNA), or;
- a subclade of Haplogroup K2a (Y-DNA).
