= Ust'-Ishim man =

Hominin fossil found in Siberia

Coordinates: 57.744°N 71.200°E

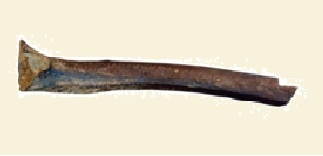
- Femur from the Ust'-Ishim man
- Common name: Ust'-Ishim man
- Species: Human
- Age: 45,000 years
- Place discovered: Ust-Ishimsky district, Omsk oblast, Russia
- Date discovered: 2008
- Discovered by: Nikolai Peristov

Ust'-Ishim man is the term given to the 45,000-year-old remains of one of the early modern humans to inhabit western Siberia. The fossil is notable in that it had intact DNA which permitted the complete sequencing of its genome, one of the oldest modern human genomes to be so decoded.

The remains consist of a single bone—left femur—of a male hunter-gatherer, which was discovered in 2008 protruding from the bank of the Irtysh River by Nikolai Peristov, a Russian sculptor who specialises in carving mammoth ivory. Peristov showed the fossil to a forensic investigator who suggested that it might be of human origin. The fossil was named after the Ust-Ishimsky District of Siberia where it had been discovered.

== Genome sequencing ==
The fossil was examined by paleoanthropologists in the Max Planck Institute for Evolutionary Anthropology, located in Leipzig, Germany. Carbon dating showed that the fossil dates back to 45,000 years ago, making it the oldest human fossil to be so dated. Scientists found the DNA intact and were able to sequence the complete genome of Ust'-Ishim man to contemporary standards of quality.

=== Y-DNA and mtDNA ===
Ust'-Ishim man belongs to Y-DNA haplogroup K-M2308. Initially, he was classified only as K(xLT). However, research by Poznik et al. (2016) found that he was K2(xK2b,K2c,K2d,K2e): positive for some but not all SNPs of K2a as it was then defined, such as M2308. Prior to this particular research, it was assumed that haplogroups K2a and NO were synonymous; however, some Y-DNA trees have since reflected Poznik's discovery that K-M2308 is the direct ancestor of NO. Other studies show that Ust’-Ishim's haplogroup most likely belongs to the NO clade rather than the more diverged K2 clade.

He belonged to mitochondrial DNA haplogroup R*, differing from the root sequence of R by a single mutation.

Both of these haplogroups and descendant subclades are now found among populations throughout Eurasia, Oceania and The Americas, although no direct descendants of Ust Ishim man's specific lineages are known from modern populations.

Examination of the sequenced genome indicates that Ust'-Ishim man lived at a point in time between the first wave of anatomically modern humans (270,000 years ago) that migrated out of Africa and the divergence of that population into distinct populations (45,000 years ago), in terms of autosomal DNA in different parts of Eurasia. Consequently, Ust'-Ishim man is not more closely related to the first two major migrations of Homo Sapiens eastward from Africa into Asia: a group that migrated along the coast of South Asia, or a group that moved north-east through Central Asia. When compared to other ancient remains, Ust'-Ishim man is more closely related, in terms of autosomal DNA to Tianyuan man, found near Beijing and dating from 42,000 to 39,000 years ago; Mal'ta boy (or MA-1), a child who lived 24,000 years ago along the Bolshaya Belaya River near today's Irkutsk in Siberia, or; La Braña man – a hunter-gatherer who lived in La Braña (modern Spain) about 8,000 years ago.

=== Relationship with Neanderthals ===
Analysis of modern human genomes reveals that humans interbred with Neanderthals between 86,000 and 37,000 years ago, resulting in the DNA of modern humans outside Africa containing between 1.5 and 2.1 percent DNA of Neanderthal origin. Neanderthal DNA in modern humans occurs in broken fragments; however, the Neanderthal DNA in Ust'-Ishim man occurs in clusters, indicating that Ust'-Ishim man lived in the immediate aftermath of the genetic interchange. The genomic sequencing of Ust'-Ishim man has led to refinement of the estimated date of mating between the two hominin species to between 52,000 and 58,000 years ago.

No relationship between Denisovans and the Ust'-Ishim man has been checked, although Denisovans have some descendants in Oceania and Asia.

=== Relationship with modern human populations ===
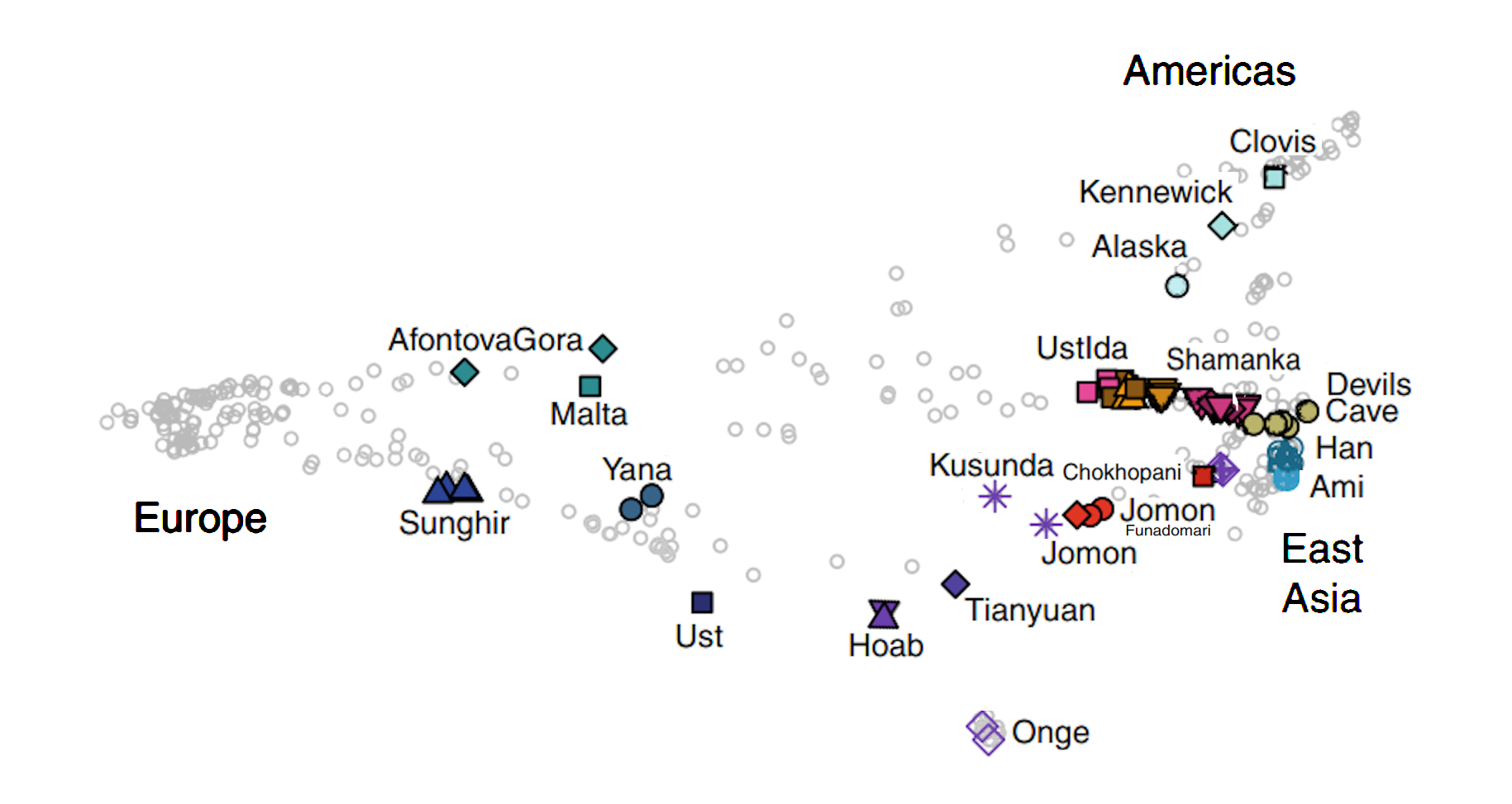
Genetic proximity of Ust'-Ishim to Ancient North Eurasian populations (Yana, Mal'ta and Afontova Gora), within a principal component analysis of ancient and present-day individuals from worldwide populations.

Ust'-Ishim was equally related to modern East Asians, Oceanians and certain ancient West Eurasian populations, such as the Goyet specimen. Modern Europeans are more closely related to other ancient remains. "The finding that the Ust’-Ishim individual is equally closely related to present-day Asians and to 8,000- to 24,000-year-old individuals from western Eurasia, but not to present-day Europeans, is compatible with the hypothesis that present-day Europeans derive some of their ancestry from a population that did not participate in the initial dispersals of modern humans into Europe and Asia."

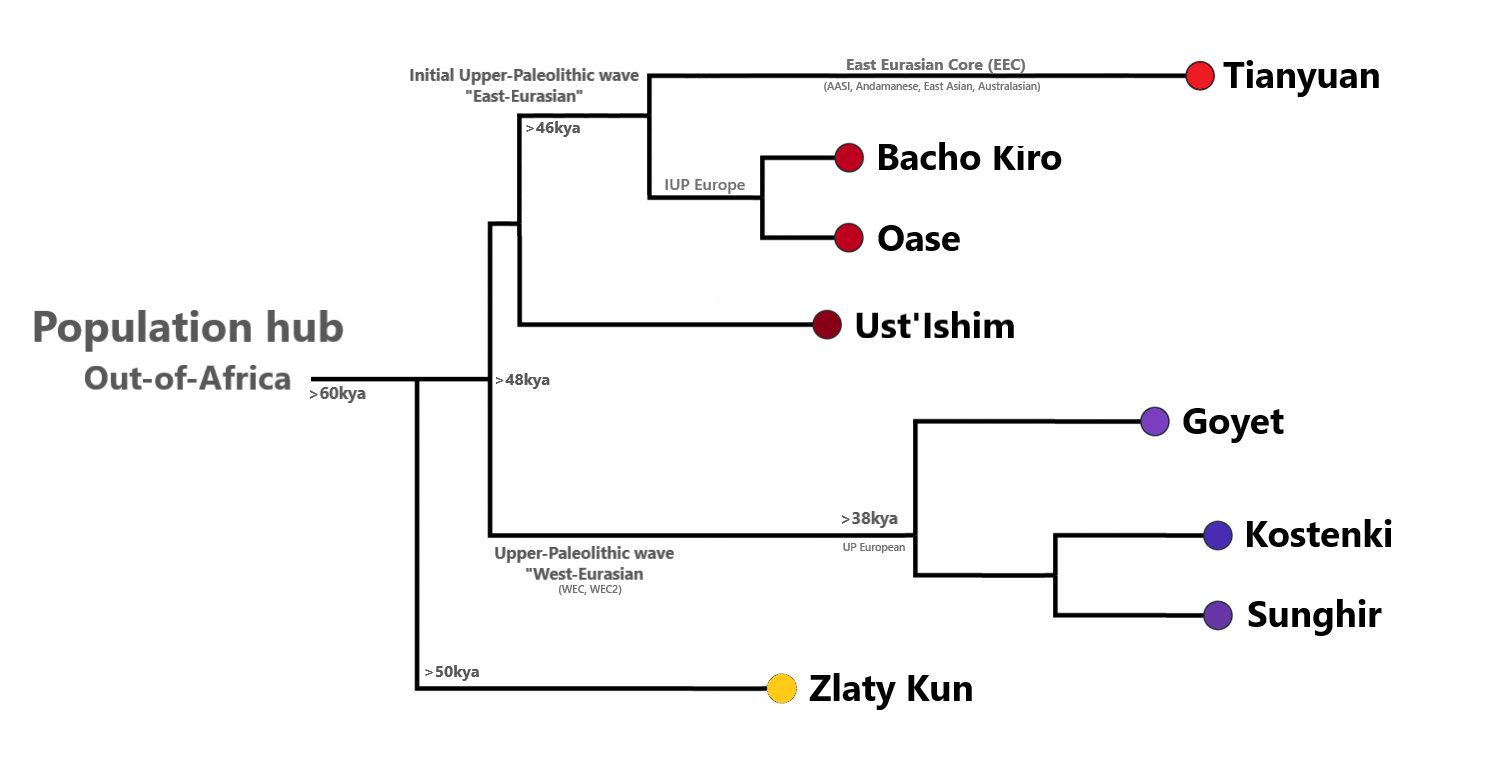
Phylogenetic position of ancient Upper Paleolithic Eurasian specimens.

In a 2016 study, modern Tibetans were identified as the modern population that has the most alleles in common with Ust'-Ishim man. According to a 2017 study, "Siberian and East Asian populations shared 38% of their ancestry" with Ust’-Ishim man. A 2021 study argues that the Ust’Ishim and Oase 1 individuals showed no more affinity to any modern western or eastern Eurasian populations, suggesting that they did not contribute ancestry to later Eurasian populations, as previously shown.

In 2022, a study determined that the Ust'Ishim man was part of an Initial Upper Paleolithic wave (>45kya) "ascribed to a population movement with uniform genetic features and material culture" (Ancient East Eurasians), and sharing deep ancestry with the Bacho Kiro, Oase and the Tianyuan man, as well as ancestors of modern-day Papuans (Australasians). The Ust’Ishim lineage is described as "near trifurcation" between West and East Eurasians, but sharing a short period of evolutionary drift with Eastern Eurasians, having diverged from their ancestor shortly after the divergence from Ancient Western Eurasians (represented by the Kostenki-14 specimen).
