= Haplogroup NO1 =

Human Y-chromosome DNA haplogroup

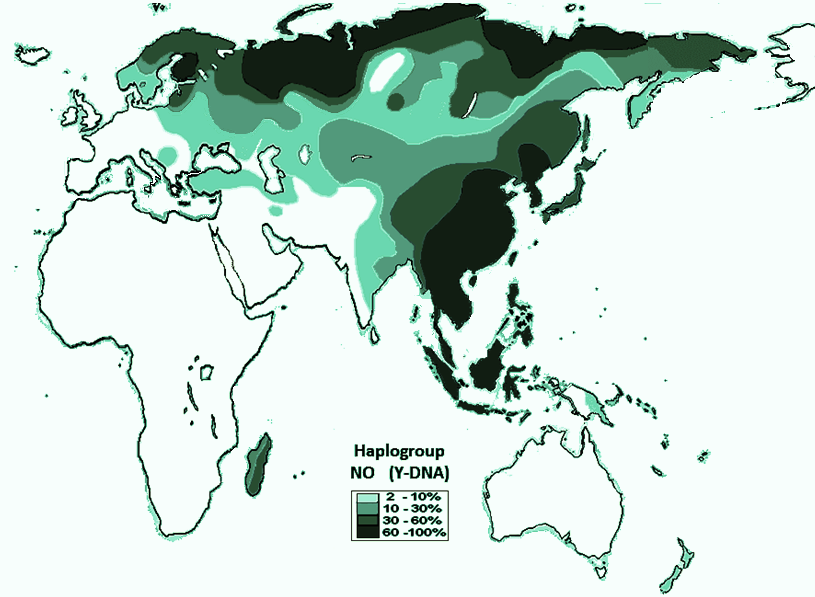
- Possible time of origin: Formed circa 48,871 years BP [95% CI 37,095 <-> 58,831] years BP, and 50,800 or 43,500 years BP) or 41,500 years BP [95% CI 37,400 <-> 45,600] years BP,
- Coalescence age: Circa 41,500–40,067 years BP (NO/NO1, based on YFull 2017, and previous estimates of: 36,800 [95% CI 34,300 <-> 39,300] years BP, 41,900 [31,294 <-> 51,202] years BP, and 44,700 or 38,300 years BP depending on mutation rate)
- Possible place of origin: Southeast Asia or East Asia (Northern China)
- Ancestor: K-M2313 (M2313/Z4858)
- Descendants: N (M231) and O (M175).
- Defining mutations: M214/Page39; F176/M2314; CTS5858/M2325/F346; CTS11572

Haplogroup NO1 (M214/Page39; F176/M2314; CTS5858/M2325/F346; CTS11572), also known as NO-M214, is a human Y-chromosome DNA haplogroup. NO1 is the most widespread subclade of haplogroup K- M2313 (a.k.a. NO-M2313, K2a1), which is the sole subclade of haplogroup K2a (K-M2308). NO is the dominant Y-DNA haplogroup in most parts of eastern and northern Eurasia, including East Asia, Siberia and northern Fennoscandia.

The location of NO1 at the SNP M214 follows the taxonomy set out by Karmin et al. 2022, and conforms to a structure shown by ISOGG (2022). However, neither ISOGG nor Karmin et al. has integrated one of the findings of Poznik et al. 2016: that there was a subclade generation both above haplogroup NO1 (M214) and beneath K-M2308. Therefore, both ISOGG and Karmin et al. continued to equate K2a with haplogroup NO.

Before 2016, the subclades compromising both NO and NO1 were not recognised, and were regarded as synonymous with K2a. Researchers such as David Poznik (Poznik et al. 2016) documented examples of previously unknown subclades of haplogroup K2, in both ancient remains and living individuals, which: (firstly) had several, varying suites of the SNPs regarded previously as uniquely defining K2a and NO, but also (secondly) lacked any of the SNPs specifically identifying haplogroups haplogroup N (M231) and haplogroup O (M175). This demonstrated conclusively that multiple stages of development separated K2a from NO, which therefore constituted "grandparent" and "grandchild" clades. Poznik et al. 2016 used the name "K2a1" (a.k.a. K-M2313) for the Y-DNA of some of the individuals who belonged to K2a(xK2a*,NO), while also mentioning that K-M2313 did not include all examples of K2a(xK2a*,NO).

As of 2022, the International Society of Genetic Genealogy (ISOGG) refers to NO-M214 as "NO1", and to K2a (M2308)/K-M2313 as "NO". There may be at least one other primary branch of NO: the ISOGG official Y-DNA haplogroup tree lists a haplogroup known as "NO1~" [sic] (CTS707/M2306) alongside NO-M214 (which ISOGG refers to as "NO1"). The tilde (~) indicates that its exact position of NO1~ in the phylogeny is unknown. It may be a primary branch or sibling of NO, it may be a primary branch or sibling of K2a, K-M2313, or it may instead be a primary branch of K2a.

== Distribution ==
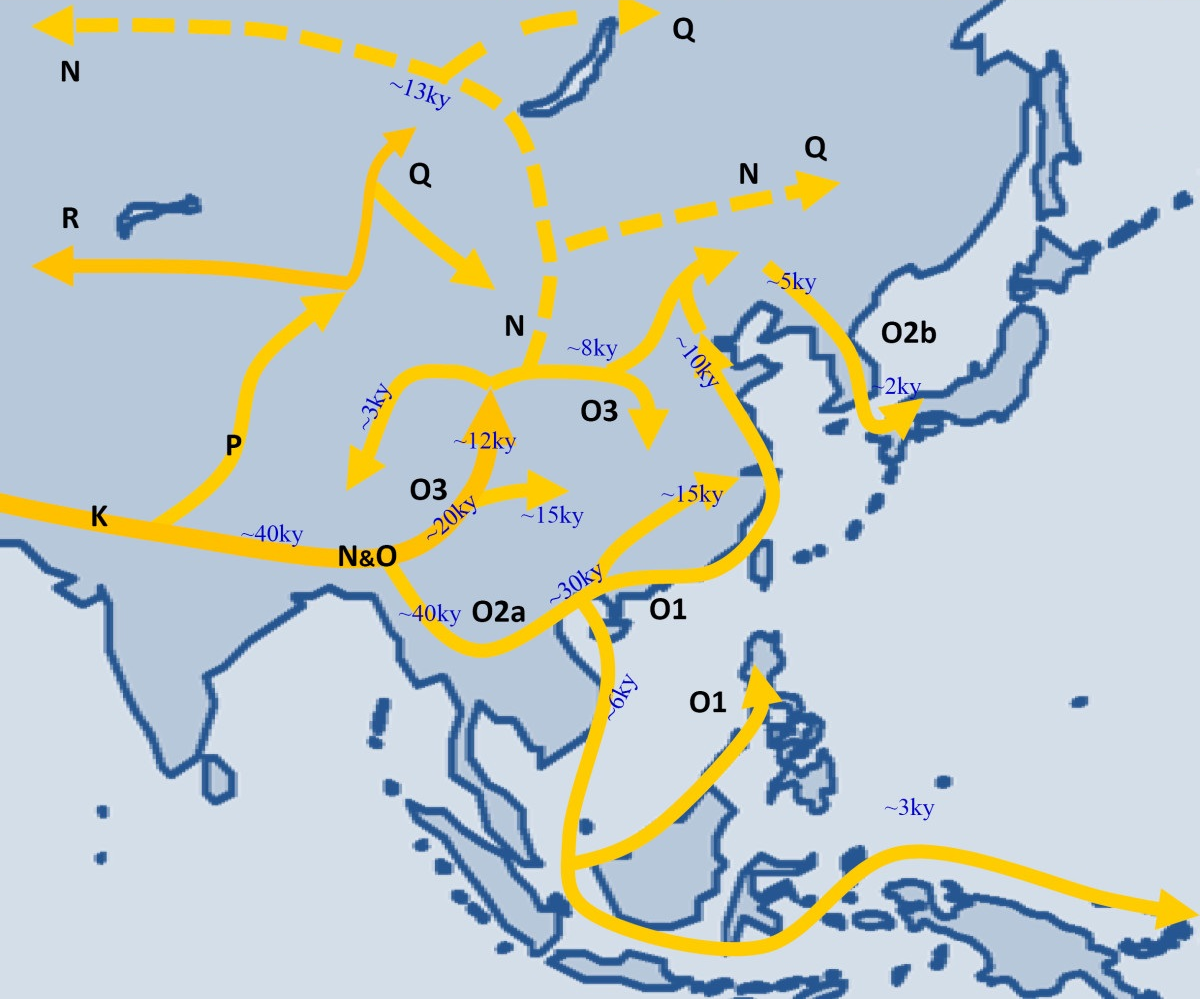
Migration of Haplogroup NO.

Members of haplogroup NO* include a Telugu of Indian origin sampled in the United Kingdom and a Malay sampled in Singapore. Haplogroup NO1 is also observed in the modern inhabitants of Tak province from Thailand (14.23%).

While there is some evidence of NO* being found in other living individuals, these examples are not well-researched. Further research may instead identify them as belonging to N* (M231), N1, or the provisional subclade N2 (F3373/M2283/Page56/S323). These cases include:

- 5.7% (2/35) of Bouyei males, in China or Vietnam;
- A pool of four samples of Japanese males at 2.9% (6/210), particularly in Tokushima Prefecture at a rate of 5.7% (4/70), and;
- Small proportions of samples from Yizu, Malays, Sô, Mongolians, Daurs, Manchurian Evenks, Hezhes, Huis, Yaos, South Koreans, Fiji (1/107 = 0.9%), Futuna 5%, Niue 3.5%, Tuvalu 3.6%, and Samoa 3%.

Two sets of ancient remains previously considered as possibly belonging to NO have since been reclassified upstream to K2a.

- Ust'-Ishim man: the remains found in Omsk Oblast, Russia, of a male who lived approximately 45,000 years BP. Until 2016, these remains were erroneously classified as K2*.
- Oase 1: the remains found in Romania of a male who lived 37,000–42,000 years BP.

Likewise, cases previously regarded as possible examples of NO* or NO1*, and since ruled out, include:

- Two Han Chinese males previously found to be negative for O* (O-M175) and LLY22g (an obsolete, possibly inaccurate marker for N1), have subsequently have been found to belong to N* (N-M231), and;
- A clade first identified in South India, defined by the SNP M147 and labelled "pre-NO" and "haplogroup X", among other names, was found to be a sibling of NO (K2a) within haplogroup K2 (K-M526); the new clade was renamed K2e (K-M147).

A 2024 study showed that several remains from Ilsenhöhle in Ranis, Germany had haplogroup NO like the Ust'Ishim remains. The Ranis individuals were more related to the Zlatý Kůň individuals and did not contribute ancestry to later modern humans outside Africa, similar to Ust'Ishim and Oase 1 individuals. However, there is evidence of some "genetic continuity and persistence in Eurasia" due to most extant East Asian paternal lineages belonging to the downstream NO. Haplogroups O-M175 and N-M231 were introduced to East Asia via the southern route although their exact origins are unclear.

== Subclades ==
=== Phylogenetic tree ===
This phylogeny of haplogroups K2a, K2a1, and NO is based on YFull 2018, Poznik 2016, ISOGG 2018, Karafet 2008.

K2a K-M2308 (M2308) Found only in the ancient remains "Ust'-Ishim man" (c. 45,000 BP) and "Oase 1" (c. 39,500 BP).

- K2a1 K-M2313 (M2313/Z4858) Named by Poznik 2016; previously not distinguished from K2a.
  - NO K-M214 (M214/Page39; F176/M2314; CTS5858/M2325/F346; CTS11572) Poznik 2016 and ISOGG 2018 distinguish between NO1 (M214), N and O.
    - N M231; CTS2947/M2175; Z4891; CTS10118
    - O M175/P186/P191/P196; F369/M1755; F380/M1757/S27659

The position of NO1~ (CTS707/M2306), a subclade of K2a1 or NO, in this phylogeny is unclear.

== See also ==
- Human Y-chromosome DNA haplogroup
- Genealogical DNA test
- Y-chromosome haplogroups in populations of the world
