= Ishim =

Ishim may refer to:

- Ishim (river), a river in Kazakhstan and Russia
- Ishim, Tyumen Oblast, a town in Tyumen Oblast, Russia
- Ishim (angel), a rank of angels in the Jewish angelic hierarchy

== See also ==
- Ishimsky (disambiguation)
- Ishimbay
