= Ust-Ishim =

Rural locality in Omsk Oblast, Russia

Coordinates: 57°41′43″N 71°10′21″E

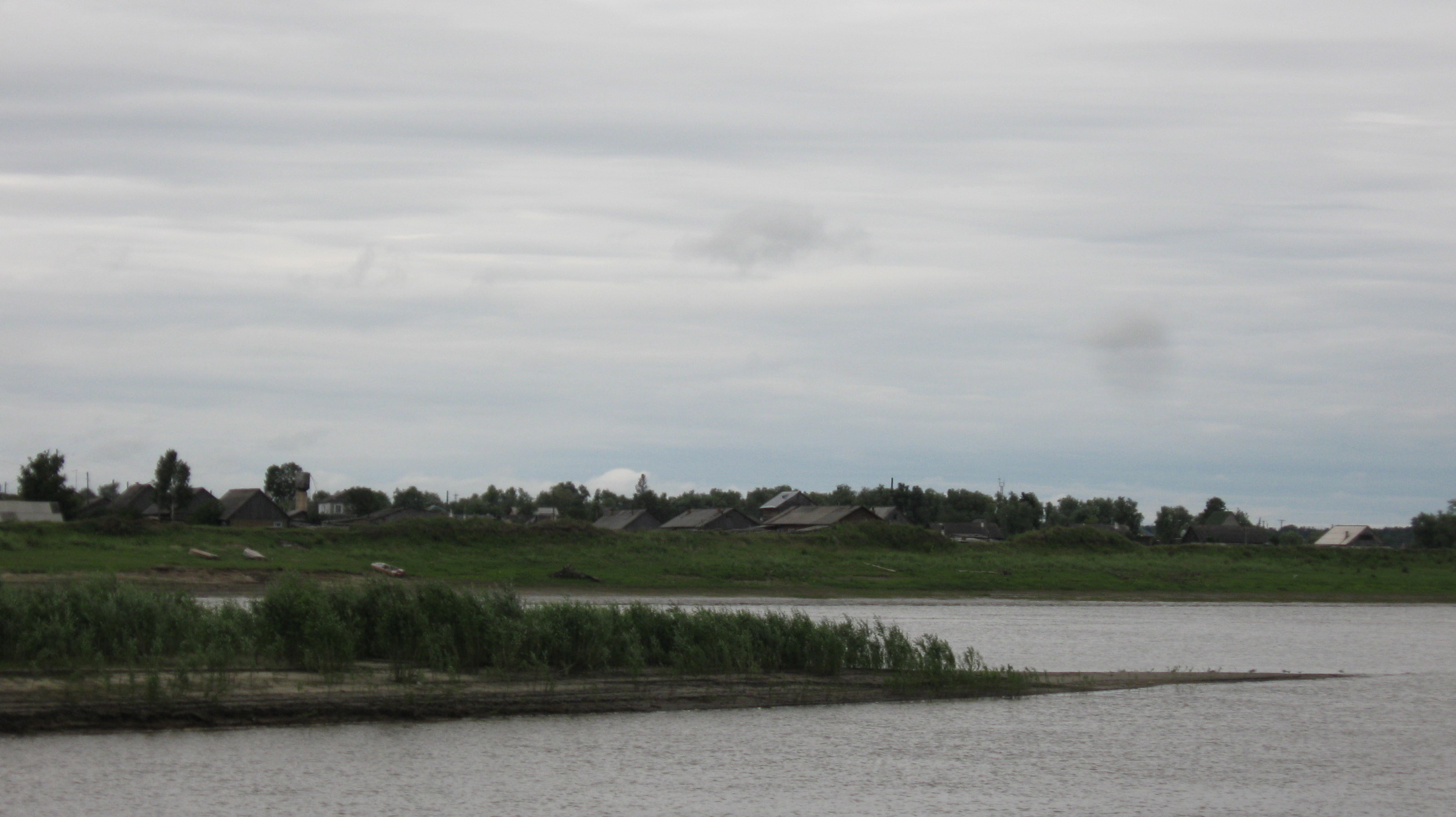
Confluence of the Ishim and the Irtysh at Ust-Ishim

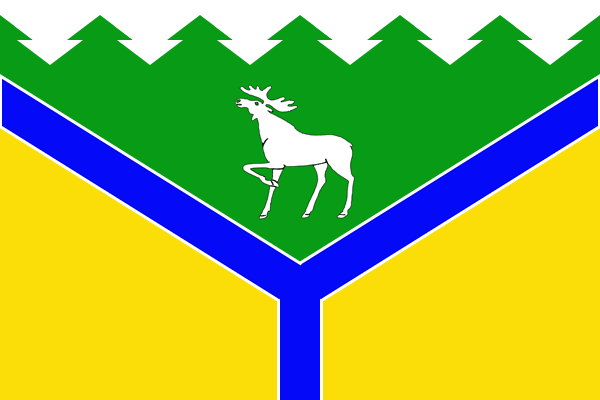
Flag of Ust-Ishim

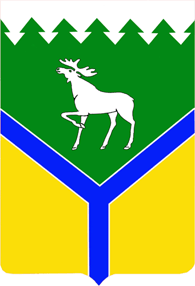
Coat of arms of Ust-Ishim

Ust-Ishim (Russian: Усть-Иши́м, Siberian Tatar: Ишим-Кала) is a rural locality (a selo) and the administrative center of Ust-Ishimsky District, Omsk Oblast, Russia. Population: 4,802 (2010 census); 5,060 (2002 census); 5,795 (1989 Soviet census).
