= Haplogroup K2a (Y-DNA) =

Human Y-chromosome DNA haplogroup

- Possible time of origin: 50,800 years BP
- Possible place of origin: Central Asia or Southeast Asia
- Ancestor: K2 (M526)
- Descendants: Sole primary subclade: K-M2313 (M2313); Confirmed secondary subclades: NO1 (also known as NO-M214); K-Y28394 (also known as NO2); K-FTC181; K-MF106925
- Defining mutations: M2308, Z4842

Haplogroup K2a (M2308, Z4842) is a human Y-chromosome DNA haplogroup. K2a is a primary subclade of haplogroup K2 (M526), which in turn is a primary descendant of haplogroup K (M9). Its sole primary descendant is haplogroup K-M2313 (M2313, Z4858 S11799).

Basal K2a* (M2308*) has so far been identified only in two Upper Paleolithic individuals, whereas all extant members of K2a belongs to the K-2313 lineage. ISOGG designates the extant lineage itself as K2a. As of 2025, K-M2313 is known to have at least four primary subclades: NO-M214 (also known as NO1), which has numerous members and the extremely rare subclades, K-Y28394 (sometimes referred to as NO2), K-FTC181, and K-MF106925. As the paraclade for haplogroups N and O, haplogroup NO-M214 is extremely numerous and includes hundreds of millions of living males, in a long geographical band, from north-eastern Europe, via East Asia, to the South Pacific.

K2a(xN,O), rare basal subclades of K2a that do not belong to haplogroups N or O, have been found in a variety of different locations, in individuals at different points in time. Basal K2a* (K-M2308*) has been found from the remains of the Ust'-Ishim man and Oase-1, who lived in Siberia and the Banat region of south-central Europe, respectively, about 37,000 to 45,000 years ago. The current existing branches of K-M2313 all share a common ancestor at K-F549. NO-M214 notably includes a majority of living males in East Asia, Southeast Asia, and Northern Eurasia. Meanwhile, K-Y28299 has been found in individuals from India and Pakistan. K-F14963 has been found among the Toba Batak (North Sumatra) and Mandar (West Sulawesi) of Indonesia. K-FTC181 and K-MF10925 has been found in individuals from Thailand and Vietnam respectively.

== Origin ==
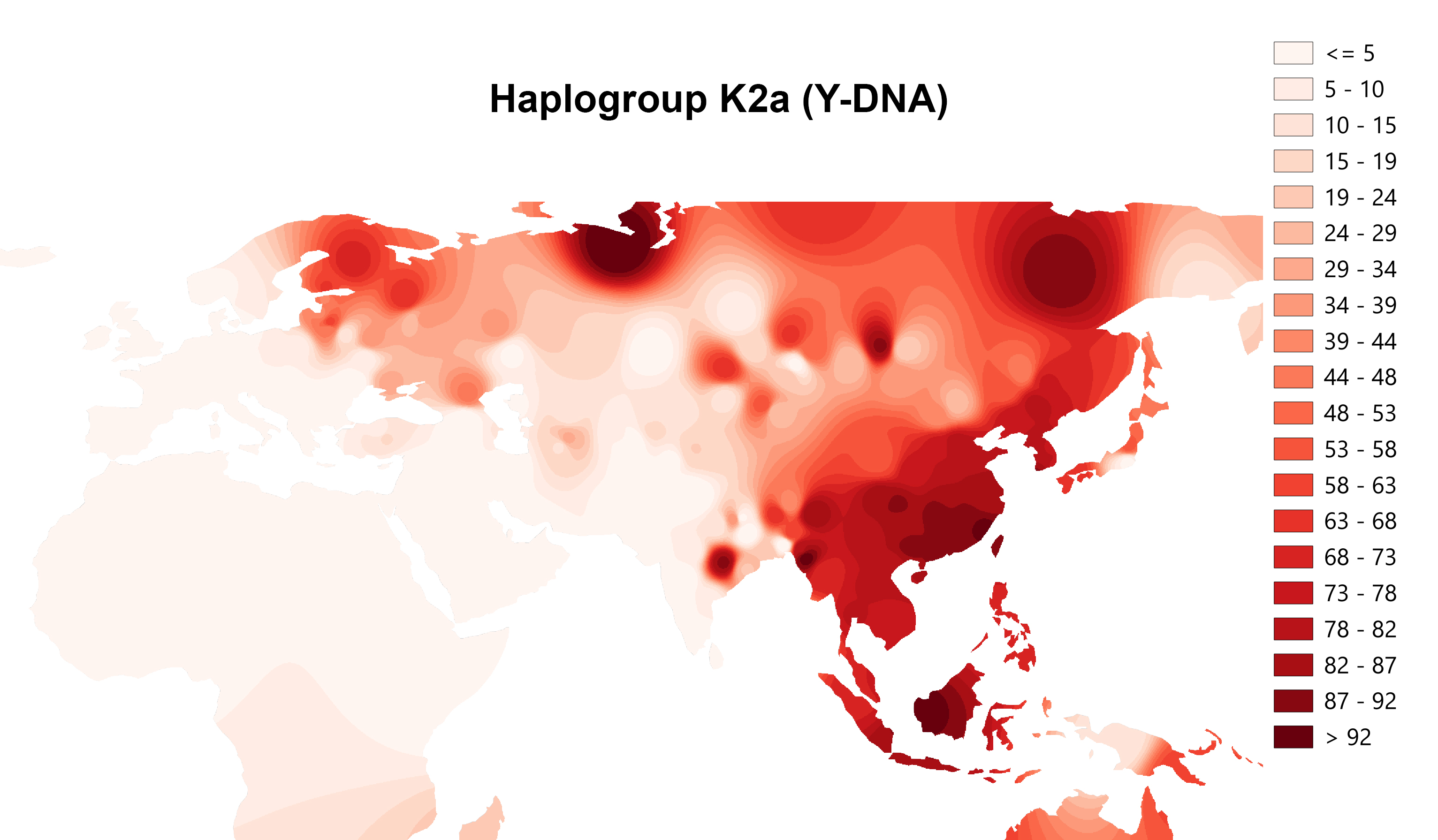
Distribution map of Y-chromosome haplogroup K2a, with notable frequency in East Asia, Southeast Asia, North Asia, and Northeast Europe.

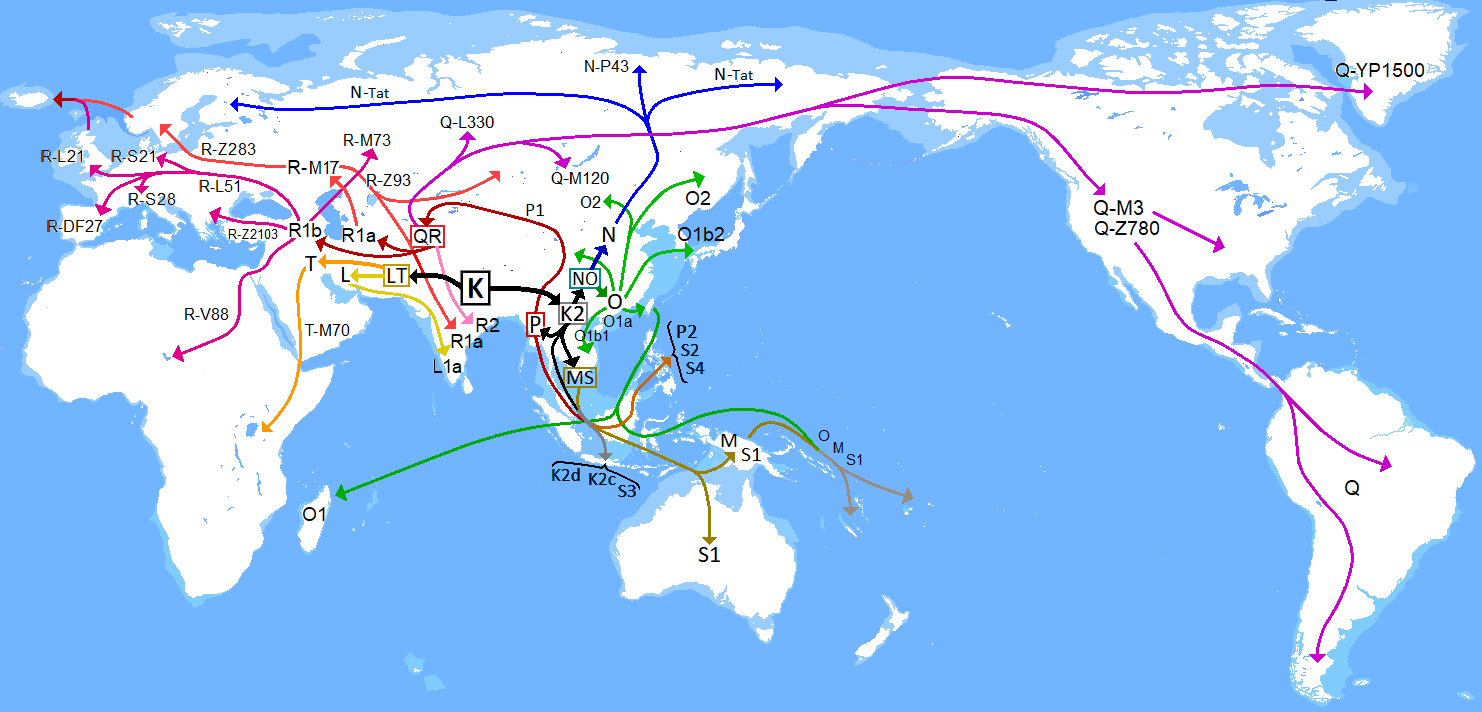
Hypothetical migration routes of haplogroup K-M9 and its subclades, including haplogroup K2a.

According to geneticist Spencer Wells, haplogroup K probably originated in the Middle East or Central Asia, possibly in the vicinity of Iran or Pakistan. However, Karafet et al. (2014) proposed that "rapid diversification ... of K-M526", also known as K2, likely occurred in Southeast Asia and later expanded to mainland Asia, although they could not rule out that it might have arisen in Eurasia and later went extinct there, and that either of these scenarios are "equally parsimonius".

== Later discoveries ==
Before 2016, many authorities considered that the SNP M2308 was always found in conjunction with SNPs such as M2313 and M214. However, researchers such as G. David Poznik discovered examples of Y-DNA that had some, but not all, of the SNPs peculiar to NO (M214), but also lacked SNPs identifying other primary subclades of K2 (M526). Poznik et al. 2016 therefore identified K2a (M2308), K-M2313 and NO (M214) as "parent", "child" and "grandchild" clades respectively. While Poznik used the name "K2a1" for K-M2313, this has not been widely adopted, possibly because K2a1 has sometimes been used as an alternate name for other, less closely related haplogroups. Poznik et al. also found that K-Y28301, which has living members in India, is descended from K-M2313. The above findings by Poznik et al. were reiterated by the work of Moreno-Mayar et al. in 2018.

As of 2018, authorities like the International Society of Genetic Genealogy (ISOGG) have not integrated the discoveries of Poznik et al.

- ISOGG has continued to use the names "K2a" and "NO" in reference to an undifferentiated clade combining K2a (M2308) and K-M2313 (i.e. Poznik's K2a and "K2a1"), while referring to NO-M214 as "NO1".

There is evidence of at least two additional primary branches within K-M2308 (Poznik: K2a) and/or K-M2313 (Poznik: K2a1).

- YFull alone lists a clade, known only as K-Y28299, branching from an undifferentiated K-M2308/K-M2313 (YFull name: K-M2335). In addition, a newer, more divergent subclade named K-Y28301 is a primary branch of K-Y28299, according to YFull. Furthermore, according to both Poznik and Moreno-Mayar, K-Y28301 is also descended from K-M2313, suggesting the following lineage: K-M2313 > K-Y28299 > K-Y28301. Three living individuals in India have been found to carry K-Y28299* or K-Y28301. (As of 2018, ISOGG had not incorporated K-Y28299 or K-Y28301.)
- ISOGG alone lists a haplogroup known only as "NO1~" [sic] identified by the SNP CTS707/M2306, as a sibling of NO-M214. (Under the taxonomic conventions used by ISOGG, a tilde [~] indicates a distinct haplogroup, the position of which in the phylogeny is as yet unclear.) NO1~ is likely a primary branch of either K-M2313 or NO-M214, because, as of 2018, YFull regards CTS707/M2306 as synonymous with M214/PAGE39/PAGES00039, and yet NO1~ is also not (according to ISOGG) ancestral to either Haplogroup N (M231) or Haplogroup O (M175).

After 2022, new clades downstream of K-F549 were detected, from scientific and personal samples of individuals across South Asia and Southeast Asia.

== Phylogenetic tree ==
K2a K-M2308 (M2308, CTS11667)

- K-M2313 (Z4952/M2339/E482, F549/M2335/S22380/V4208, (Note: Some authorities, such as ISOGG and YFull, do not yet include the separation of the subclade defined by the SNP F549/M2335/S22380/V4208 from the clade defined by the SNPs M2308 and Z4842, identified by Poznik et al. (2016).) Z4842/M2308/V1371, F650/M2346,
  Z4858/M2313/S11799/E295/E205, Z4829)
  - K-FTC181
  - K-MF106925
  - K-Y28394 (Note: Position of K-Y28299 and its subclade K-Y28301 based on YFull 2018. In addition, while K-Y28299 is not specifically mentioned by researchers such as Poznik et al. (2016) and Moreno-Mayar et al. (2018), these sources do state that K-Y28301 is a lineal descendant of K-M2313.)
    - Y28299
      - K-Y28301 (Note: No phylogenetic name as of 2018; according to YFull, K-Y28301 is a primary branch of K-Y28299. In addition, according to Poznik et al. 2016 and Moreno-Mayar et al. 2018, K-Y28301 is a descendant of K-M2313.) (Y28301/Y28328, Y28358, Y28410)
    - K-F14963
  - NO (Note: ISOGG 2018 name NO1.) (M214/Page39, F176/M2314, CTS5858/M2325/F346, CTS11572)
    - N (M231, CTS2947/M2175, Z4891, CTS10118)
    - O (M175/P186/P191/P196, F369/M1755, F380/M1757/S27659)

? "NO1~" (Note: "NO1~" is a temporary name used by ISOGG (2018). Approximate position only; YFull (2018) regards CTS707/M2306 as concurrent with M214/Page39, suggesting that NO1~ is a primary branch of K-M2313 or NO-M214.) (CTS707/M2306)

Notes regarding phylogenetic tree

== Distribution ==
=== K2a* (K-M2308*) ===
K2a* has been found only in the Paleolithic remains mentioned above:

- "Ust'-Ishim man", the remains of one of the early modern humans who inhabited western Siberia around 45,000 years ago. The fossil was named after the Ust'-Ishim District of Siberia where it had been discovered. Until 2016, Ust'-Ishim man was previously classified as belonging to Haplogroup K2*.
- "Oase-1", the remains of an individual who lived in Eastern Europe (modern Romania) around 37,800 years ago.

=== K-M2313 ===
K-M213(xNO-M214) was detected in samples from South and Southeast Asia.

=== NO (M214) ===
Basal examples of haplogroup NO* have not been identified.

Subclades of haplogroup NO include a majority of living males in East Asia, Southeast Asia and Northern Eurasia.

=== K-Y28394 ===
K-Y28299(xY28301) has been found in individuals from India and Pakistan.

K-Y28301, a subclade of K-Y28299, has been found in living individuals with their origins in Andhra Pradesh and Arunachal Pradesh India.

K-F14963, another subclade of Y28394, has been found in individuals among the Toba Batak, Mandar, and other groups in Southeast Asia.

=== K-FTC181, K-MF10925 ===
K-FTC181 and K-MF10925 has been found in individuals from Thailand and Vietnam.

== See also ==
- Human Y-chromosome DNA haplogroup
- Genealogical DNA test
- Y-chromosome haplogroups in populations of the world
