= Peștera cu Oase =

Cave and archaeological site in Romania

Peștera cu Oase Cave
- Peștera cu Oase
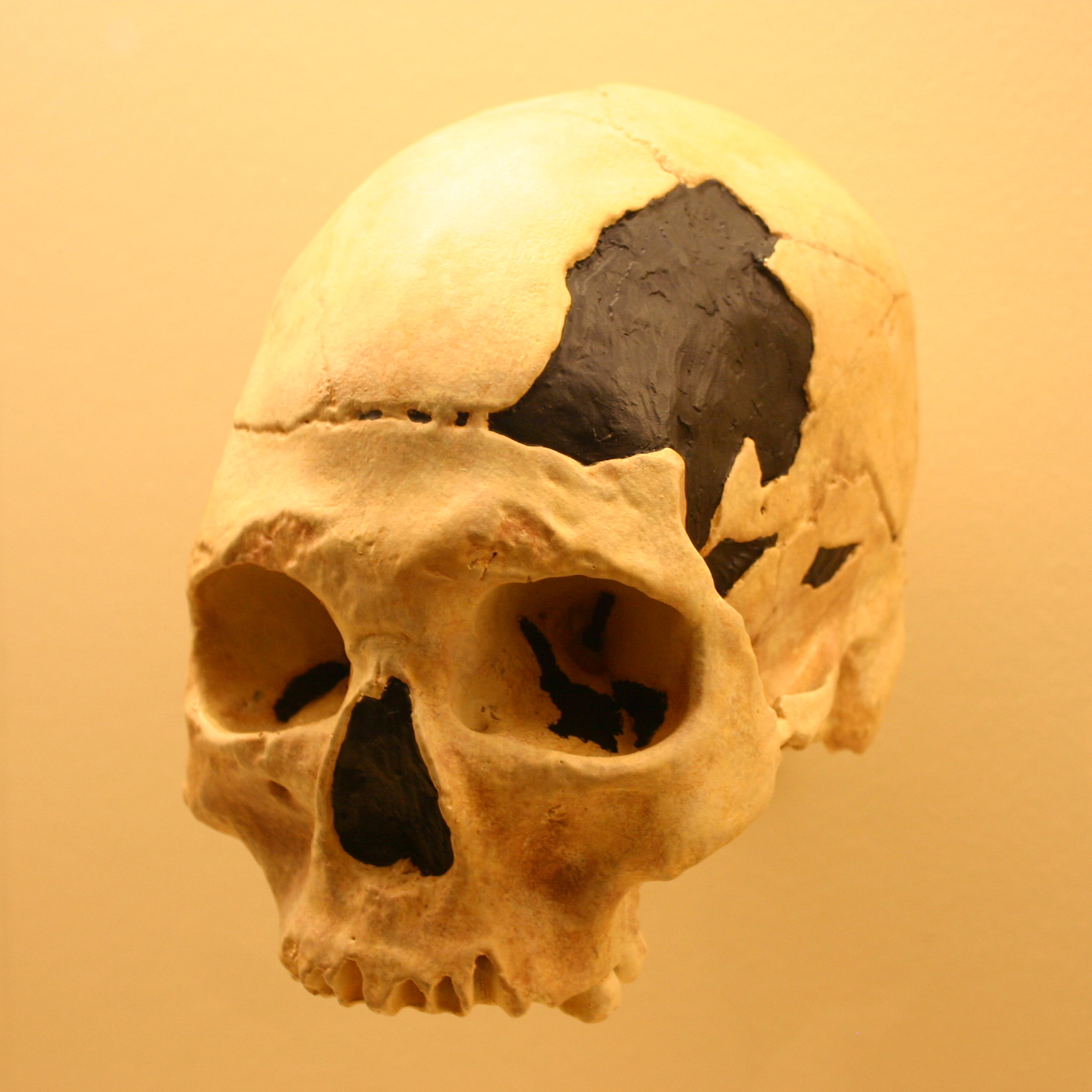
- Oase 2 skull

- location in Romania Peștera cu Oase (Romania)
- 45°01′N 21°50′E
- Periods: Paleolithic
- Location: near Anina city
- Region: Caraș-Severin county, southwestern Romania

Peștera cu Oase (Romanian pronunciation: [ˈpeʃtera ku ˈo̯ase], meaning "The Cave with Bones") is a system of 12 karstic galleries and chambers located near the city Anina, in Caraș-Severin County, southwestern Romania, where some of the oldest European early modern human (EEMH) remains, between 42,000 and 37,000 years old, have been found.

While the "Oase 1" lower jaw is fully mature, the facial skeleton is that of a mid-second-decade adolescent, therefore corresponding to a second individual, designated as "Oase 2". Further analyses have revealed that the left temporal bone represents a third individual, assessed as adolescent versus mature female, designated as "Oase 3". However, additional finds and work have shown that the temporal bone derives from the same cranium as the "Oase 2" facial and parietal bones. The lack of archaeological signs such as torches, charcoal or tools could suggest that the human remains may have washed into the cave through fissures. The "Oase 2" and "Oase 3" confirm a pattern already known from the probably contemporaneous "Oase 1" mandible, indicating a mixture of archaic, early modern human and Neanderthal morphological features. Thus, the specimens exhibit a suite of derived "modern human" features like projecting chin, no brow ridge, a high and rounded brain case. Yet, these features are associated with several archaic aspects of the cranium and dentition that place them outside the range of variation for modern humans, like a large face, a large crest of bone behind the ear and big teeth that get even larger toward the back. This mosaic of Neanderthal and modern human resembles similar traits found in a 25,000 year old fossil of a child in Abrigo do Lagar Velho or in the 31,000 year old site of Mladeč, by Cidália Duarte, et al. (1999).

In 2015 genetic research revealed that the Oase 1 fossil had a recent Neanderthal ancestor, with an estimated 5-11% Neanderthal autosomal DNA. The specimen's 12th chromosome was 50% Neanderthal.

== The cave ==
In February 2002, a speleological team exploring the karstic system of Miniș Valley, in the southwestern Carpathian Mountains near Anina, discovered a previously unknown chamber with a profusion of mammalian skeletal remains. The cave, which seemed to have served primarily as hibernation room for the Late Pleistocene cave bear (Ursus spelaeus), presented unusual arrangements such as the placement of some remains on raised rocks, suggesting a certain human involvement in the accumulated deposits. In fact, speleologists Ștefan Milota, Adrian Bîlgăr and Laurențiu Sarcina discovered a complete human mandible on the paleosurface. The karstic chamber was designated as Peștera cu Oase (The Cave with Bones) and the human mandible as "Oase 1" (also dubbed Ion din Anina "John of Anina").

The latest radiocarbon dates of the Oase fossils give an age of 37,800 years BP. From a location close to the Iron Gates in the Danubian corridor, they may represent one of the earliest modern human populations to have entered Europe.

== Oase 1 ==
In June 2003 a further research team with Ștefan Milota, Ricardo Rodrigo, and Mircea Gherase discovered additional human remains on the cave's surface. Belonging to an adult male, these comprised an entire anterior cranial skeleton that was found along with a largely complete left temporal bone and a number of frontal, parietal and occipital bone segments.

The calibrated radiocarbon date for "Oase 1" is 40,450±1020 BP.

Oase 1 exhibits morphological traits from early modern humans and archaic humans, including Neanderthal features.

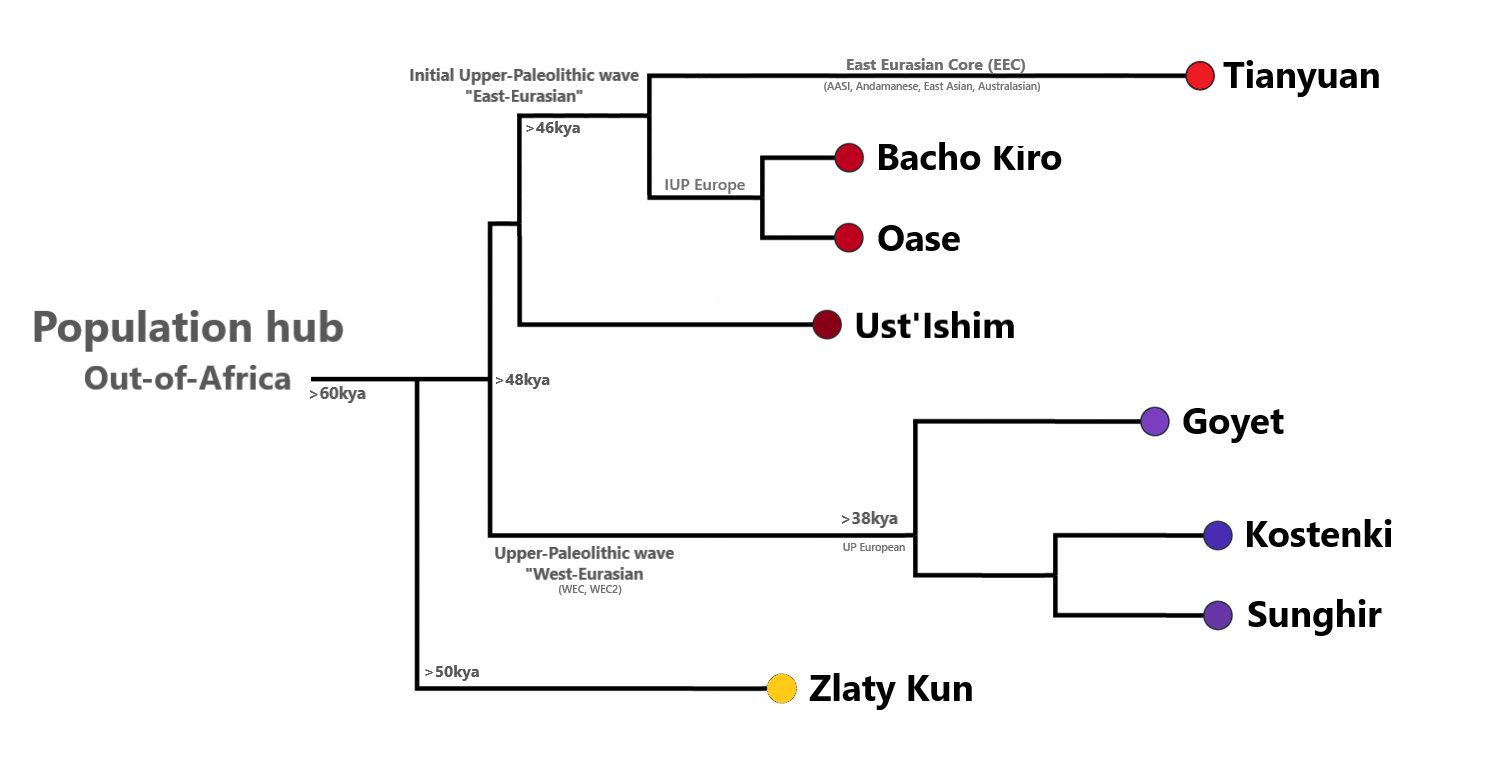
Phylogenetic position of ancient Upper Paleolithic Eurasian specimens.

DNA analysis of Oase 1 since 2015 has made a number of significant findings.

- About 6-9% of the genome is Neanderthal in origin. This is the highest percentage of archaic introgression found in an anatomically modern human and together with the linkage disequilibrium patterns indicates that Oase 1 had a relatively-recent Neanderthal ancestor – about four to six generations earlier.
- The autosomal DNA of Oase 1 shares equal alleles with both Mesolithic Europeans and East Eurasians, such that he may share more alleles with modern East Asian populations, than with modern Europeans. In other words, Oase 1 has negligible levels of genetic components found in modern Europeans, including so-called Basal Eurasian ancestry later carried to (or supplemented in) Europe, by Anatolian Neolithic farmers and Yamnaya pastoralists.
- Oase 1 belongs to an extinct Y-DNA haplogroup and an extinct mitochondrial DNA haplogroup.
  - Research by Poznik et al. (2016) suggests that Oase 1 Y-DNA belongs to haplogroup K2a*. That is, Oase 1 possesses SNPS similar to Ust'-Ishim man (also K2a*), 45,000-year-old remains from Siberia, and upstream from Haplogroup NO and a rare lineage found in two living males (from ethnic Telugu and Malay backgrounds, respectively, for whom Poznik et al. proposed the creation of a new subclade, named "K2a1"). (Earlier research by Fu et al. reported that Oase 1 belonged to a subclade of Y-DNA haplogroup F, other than haplogroups G, H, I and J – leaving open the possibility that Oase 1 belonged to macrohaplogroup K.)
  - According to Fu, Oase-1's maternal lineage is related to mitochondrial DNA haplogroup N, but diverged from all other N clades before they diverged from each other.

== Oase 2 ==
Oase 2
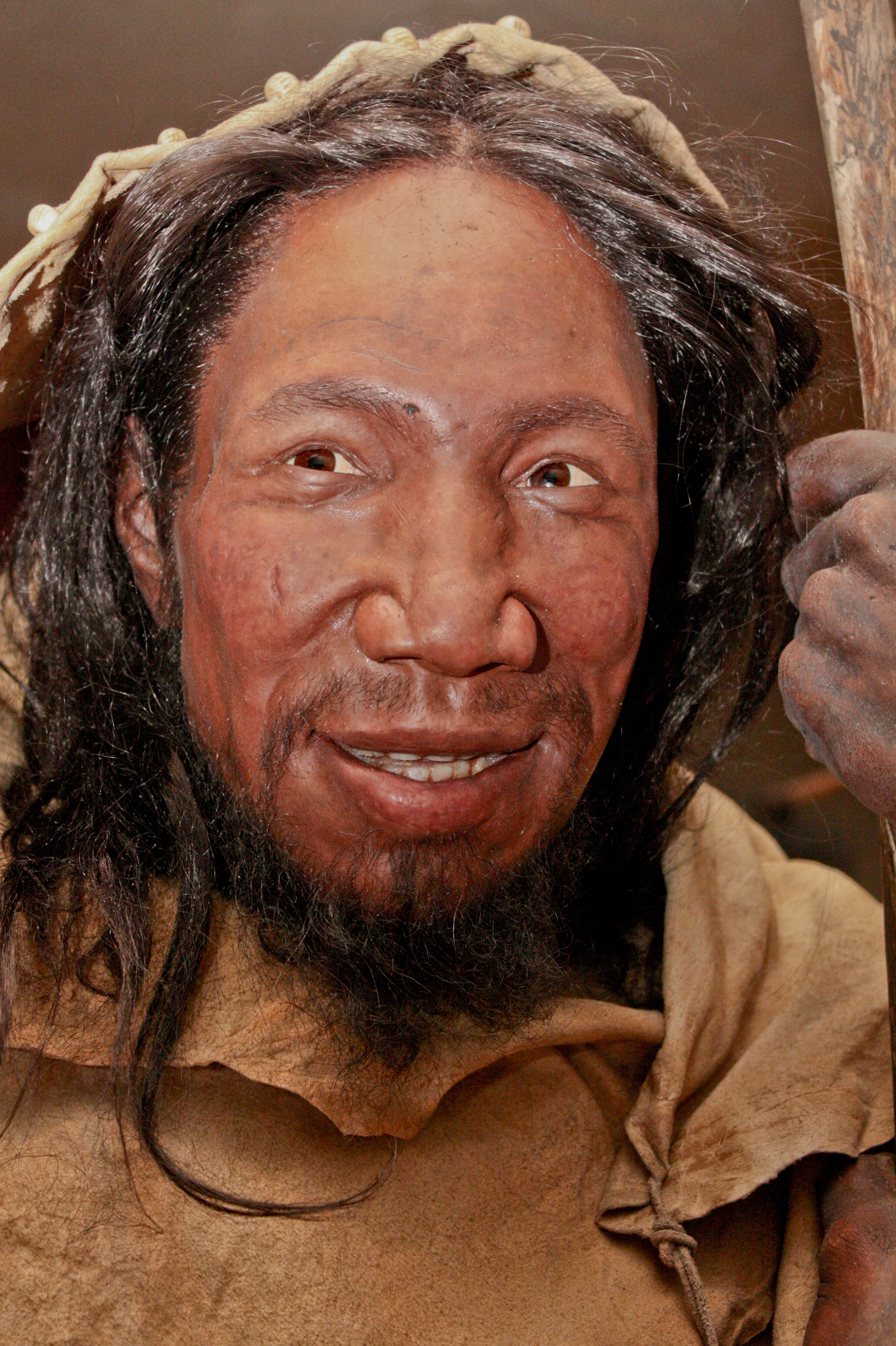
- Forensic facial reconstruction of Oase 2. Exhibited in the Neanderthal Museum in Mettmann, Germany.

Scientific classification
- Kingdom: Animalia
- Phylum: Chordata
- Class: Mammalia
- Order: Primates
- Superfamily: Hominoidea
- Family: Hominidae
- Subtribe: Hominina
- Genus: Homo
- Species: H. neanderthalensis × H. sapiens

Researchers sequenced the genome of "Oase 2" (41,500–39,500 years old) to high coverage (20-fold) from its petrous bone.

Around 6% of "Oase 2"'s genome is Neanderthal in origin, which is lower than for "Oase 1"; however, this is still much higher than expected based on its age and what is seen in other Upper Palaeolithic genomes.

"Oase 2" belongs to the same basal subclade of mitochondrial DNA haplogroup N as "Oase 1". When compared against all DNA samples on record, "Oase 2" and "Oase 1" share the closest genetic affinity with each other. "Oase 1" and "Oase 2" appear to be from related, but not necessarily identical populations.

"Oase 1" shows an affinity for Ice Age Europeans that is not found in "Oase 2", while "Oase 2" is closer to Asians and Native Americans. "Oase 1" shows a genetic affinity for "Peştera Muierii 2" that is not found in "Oase 2". After "Oase 1", the next closest genetic affinity for "Oase 2" among ancient DNA samples is the c. 40kya Tianyuan man from Northern China. Neither "Oase 2" nor "Oase 1" are particularly close genetically to any modern human populations.

== Current research ==
Peștera cu Oase is subject to ongoing investigation. The on-site findings from the 2005 campaign are currently cross-examined at the Romanian "Emil Racoviță" Institute of Speleology, Australian National University, (electron spin resonance and uranium-series dating on 21 bone/tooth samples and 29 associated sediment samples), University of Bristol, (uranium-series analysis on 22 bone samples), University of Bergen, (uranium-series dating on 7 samples), University of Oxford (AMS radiocarbon dating on 8 bone/tooth samples), Max Planck Institute (stable isotope analysis and ancient DNA on 37 bone/tooth samples), University of Vienna (AMS radiocarbon dating on 25 bone/tooth samples).

A skull found in Peștera cu Oase in 2004/5 bears features of both modern humans and Neanderthals. Radiocarbon dating indicates that the skull is 37,800 years old, making it amongst the oldest modern human fossils ever found in Europe. Erik Trinkaus (2007) concluded that the two groups interbred thousands of years ago.

== Implications for research ==
The marked contrast between the morphological modernity of "early modern" humans and even late "classical Neanderthal" trait-packages, as well as mitochondrial aDNA differences have suggested a major physical anthropological discontinuity and hence, a complete population replacement at the Middle-to-Upper Palaeolithic transition, leading to what one might call "Out of Africa with Complete Replacement" model.

However, more recent direct dating of fossils has demonstrated that early modern human remains were instead of the mid/late Holocene, hence much younger than supposed.

In this context, the particular importance of the "Peștera cu Oase" findings resides both in the mixture of modern human and archaic (Neanderthal) features and in the fact that they are sufficiently complete to be taxonomically diagnosed and directly dated. Thus, the Oase fossils overlap in time for some 3000 years with late Neanderthals like those of Vindija Cave (Croatia) dated to ~32,000 radiocarbon years BP or less for Arcy-sur-Cure (France) at ~34,000 radiocarbon years BP. Besides, the notion that the Oase people are very close to the time of contact with Neanderthals is consistent with their archaic traits, and finds additional support in the patterns of spatio-temporal distribution of the latest Neanderthal remains.

Since genetics does not reject the hypothesis of a Neanderthal-modern admixture, and morphological and archaeological evidence suggest that Neanderthal lineages survived into later Upper Paleolithic populations, "Peștera cu Oase" findings provide a strong argument in favor of an admixture model between regional Neanderthals and early modern humans.

Arguing with chronological overlapping and morphological blending, this model assumes significant Neanderthal/modern human admixture, suggesting that already on their arrival in Europe, modern humans met, intermixed and interbred with Neanderthals.

When modern humans entered Europe, they encountered people with the same cognitive capabilities and featuring identical levels of cultural achievement. In such a situation, the entire gamut of cultural interaction situations, from conflict to mutual avoidance and full admixture, must have ensued at the local and regional level. But the overall result in the long-term continental perspective was that of biological and cultural blending, the imbalance in the size of the gene reservoirs involved explaining the eventual loss of Neanderthal mtDNA lineages among later and extant humans.

== See also ==
- Peștera Muierilor
- Prehistoric Romania
