= Kara-Bom =

Archaeological site in Russia

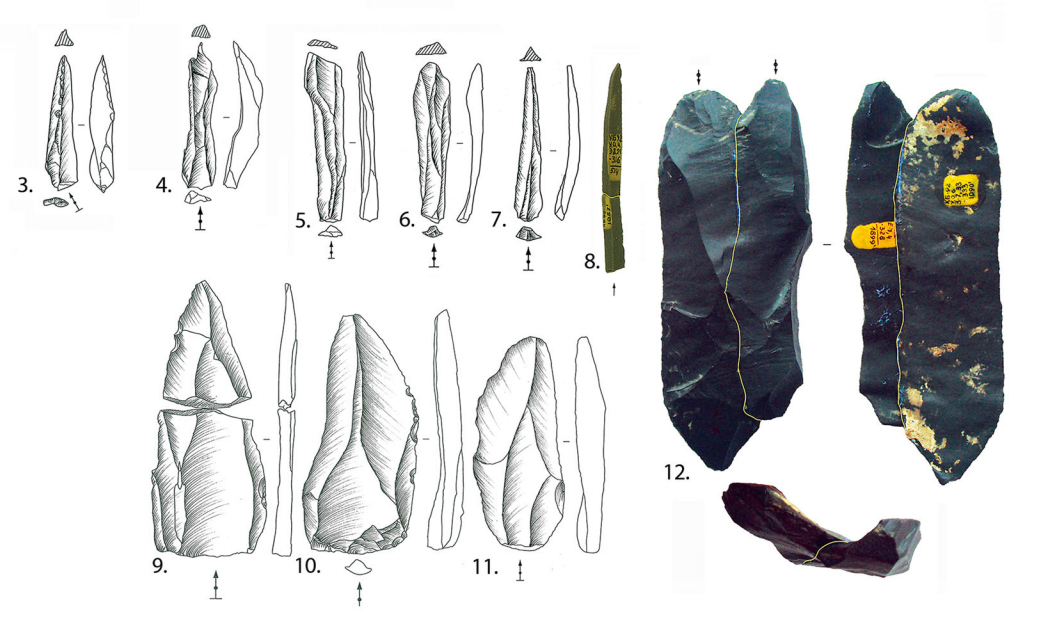
- Blades from Kara-Bom.

- Location in Continental Asia Kara-Bom (Russia)
- 50.5°N 85.980127°E
- Periods: Upper Paleolithic

Kara-Bom is an Initial Upper Paleolithic archaeological site dating to 46,620 +/-1,750 cal years before present (BP), and located in Southern Siberia. It is among the earliest (probable) modern human sites for Siberia, together with Kara-Tenesh, Kandabaevo, and Podzvonskaya.

The site of Kara-Bom has lithic assemblages consisting in classic and elongated Levallois points. The site would represent a key station in the expansion of modern humans associated with the IUP wave out of Southwest Asia slightly before 47 ka cal BP, one of the next stations being Ust-Ishim. They ended in Bacho Kiro cave and Oase, but this wave of colonization did not go as far as Western Europe, and apparently was not successful.

Unambiguous modern human sites in Siberia and Eastern Asia where modern human remains were found, start with Ust-Ishim (45,000 years BP) or Tianyuan (c. 40,000 BP), followed by significantly later sites such as Yana RHS (c. 32,000 BP).

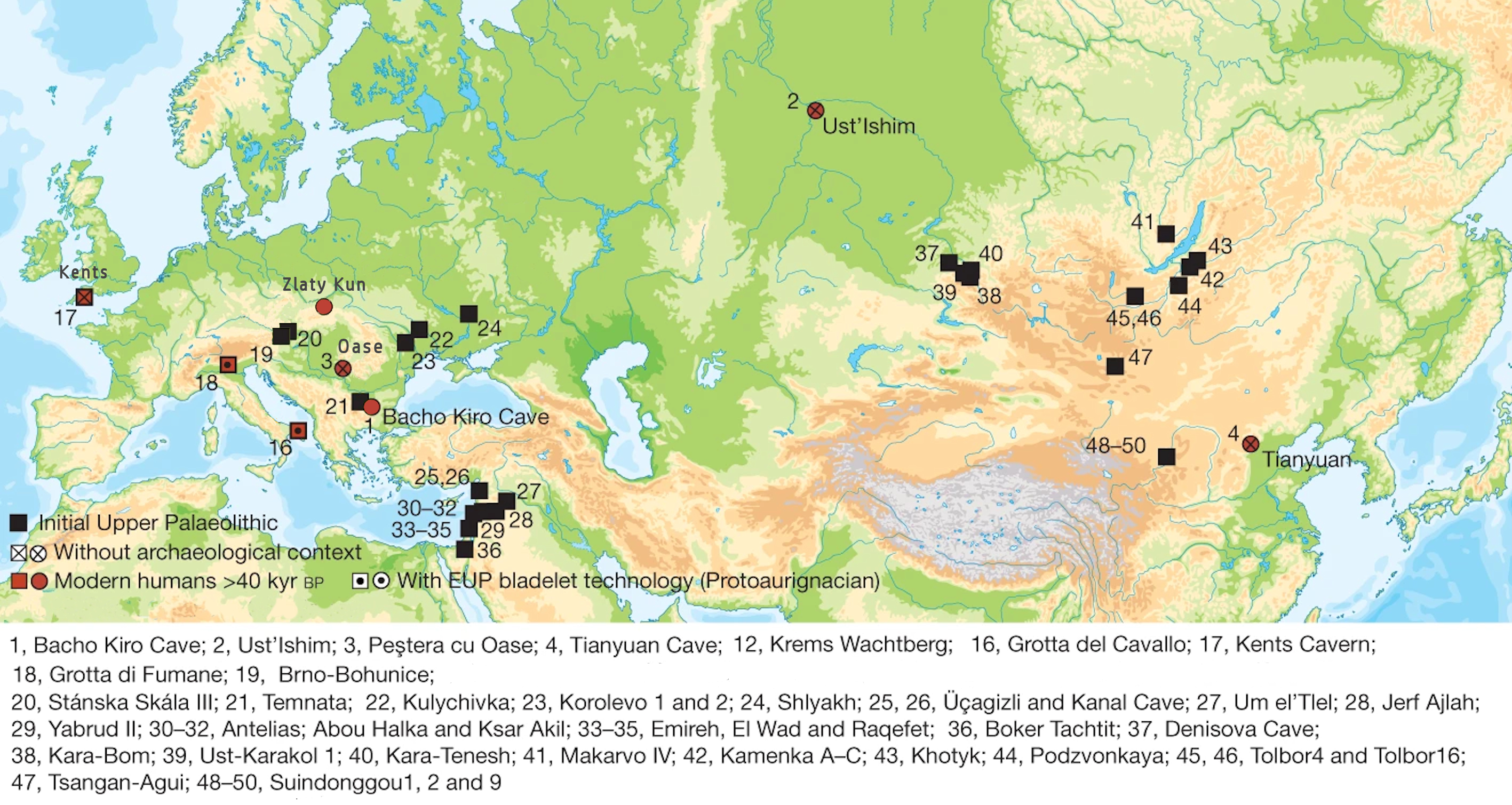
Kara-Bom, and other main Initial Upper Paleolithic human remains ( ) and stone assemblage sites ( ).
