= Danubian corridor =

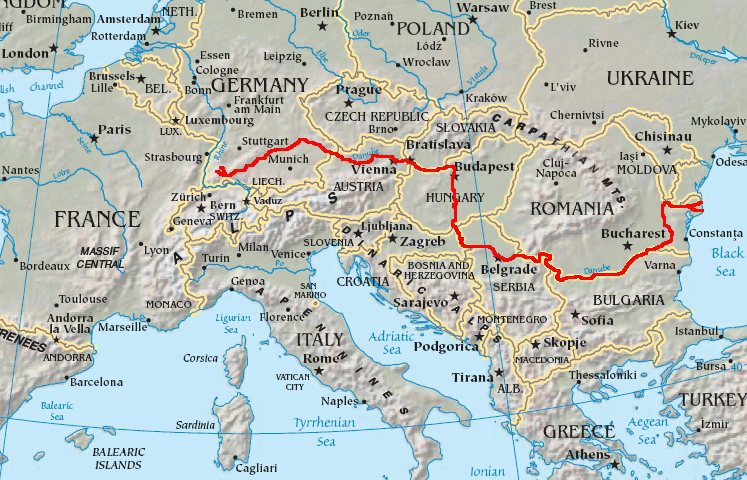
Topography of Europe, with Danube marked red

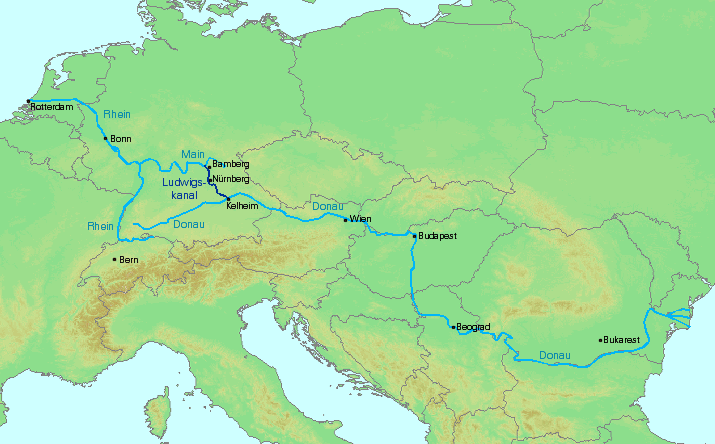
The Ludwigskanal in the context of the Rhine and Danube

In paleontology and archaeology, the Danubian corridor or Rhine-Danube corridor refers to a route along the valleys of the Danube River and Rhine River of various migrations of Eastern cultures from Asia Minor, the Aegean region, the Pontic–Caspian steppe, etc., into the north and northwest of Europe.

== See also ==
- Rhine–Main–Danube Canal
