= Nwya Devu =

- 尼阿底 (Japanese)
- Location in Tibet Nwya Devu (China)
- 31°28′N 88°48′E
- Type: open-air site
- Location: Xainza County, Nagqu, Tibet Autonomous Region, China
- Region: eastern Changtang

Site notes
- Elevation: 4,600 m (15,100 ft)
- Excavation dates: 2013, 2016-2018

Nwya Devu (Chinese: 尼阿底; pinyin: Ní'ādǐ; Tibetan: ཉ་དེའུ་གནའ་ཤུལ།, Wylie: Nya-de'u gNa-shul) is a high-altitude archaeological site on the Tibetan Plateau located in the eastern Changtang region of Tibet. At around 4,600 m (15,092 ft) above sea level, Nwya Devu is the highest known archaeological site from the Paleolithic and provides evidence for one of the earliest known presences of humans at a high-altitude site, at around 40,000-30,000 BP.

== Background ==
The site was discovered in 2013 during systematic archaeological surveying performed by the Tibetan Cultural Relics Conservation Institute and the Institute of Vertebrate Paleontology and Paleoanthropology. Nwya Devu lies on the former lacrustrine terrace of Co Ngoin, a nearby freshwater lake to the site's north.

== Stratigraphy ==
Archaeologists identified three stratigraphic layers at the site and excavated around 170 cm (6 ft) worth of deposits in depth. Layer 1 is OSL dated from around 13,000 to 4,000 BP. Mollusc shells taken from the lowest part of Layer 1 yielded AMS date ranges from around 12,700 to 12,400 BP, which shows concurrence with the OSL dating. Layer 2 is OSL dated from around 25,000 to 18,000 BP and corresponds with the Last Glacial Maximum. The earliest layer, Layer 3, is OSL dated to around 45,000 to 30,000 BP. While artefacts were found outside of Layer 3, the archaeologists who worked the site believe that all of the artefacts come from the assemblage associated with Layer 3. Paleo-environmental evidence suggests that the local climate was milder during the time of Layer 3 when compared against the present.

== Artefacts ==
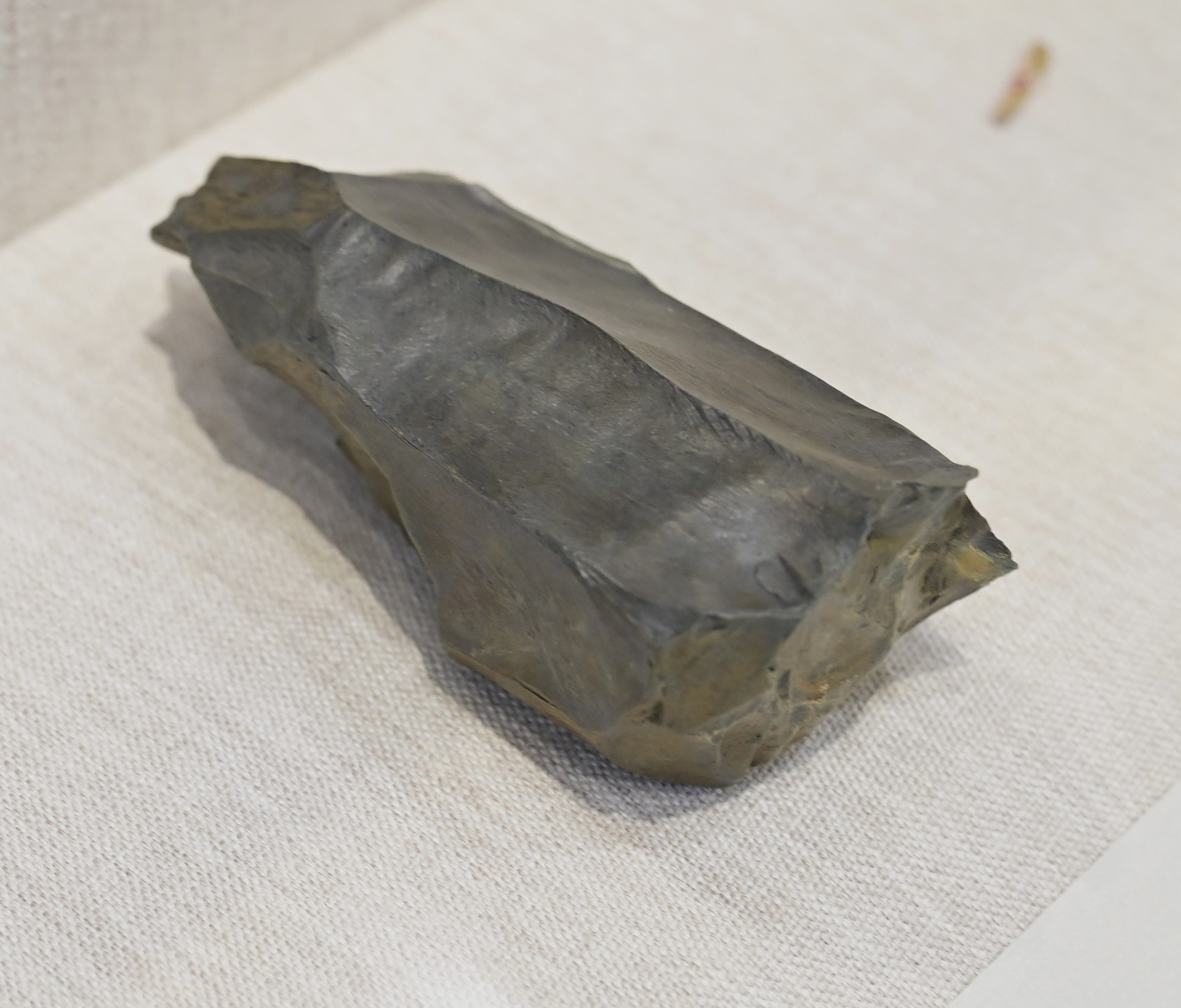
Core from Nwya Devu, Paleozoological Museum of China

3,683 lithic artefacts were excavated from the site. The lithic assemblage at Nwya Devu consists primarily of blade cores, flake cores, blades, flakes, chunks, and tools. All of the lithic artefacts at Newa Devu were sourced from black slate that was locally derived, from nearby Nwya Devu Hill, which lies around 800 m (2,625 ft) east of the site. Blades found at the site were made using a non-Levallois technique, through the use of prismatic cores. Archaeologists believe that Nwya Devu, with access to a good source of raw materials nearby, was likely the site of a lithic tool-making workshop, with a primary focus on creating long knives and scrapers that could be hafted. Some of the excavated blades were over 20 cm (8 in) in length. The lithic assemblage at Nwya Devu appears to be unique and not obviously related to any other sites in East Asia. It shows some similarities to sites from the Early Upper Paleolithic in Siberia (Kara Bom) and Mongolia (Tolbor-21).
