= Ust-Ishimsky District =

Ust-Ishimsky District Усть-Ишимский район (Russian)
- District
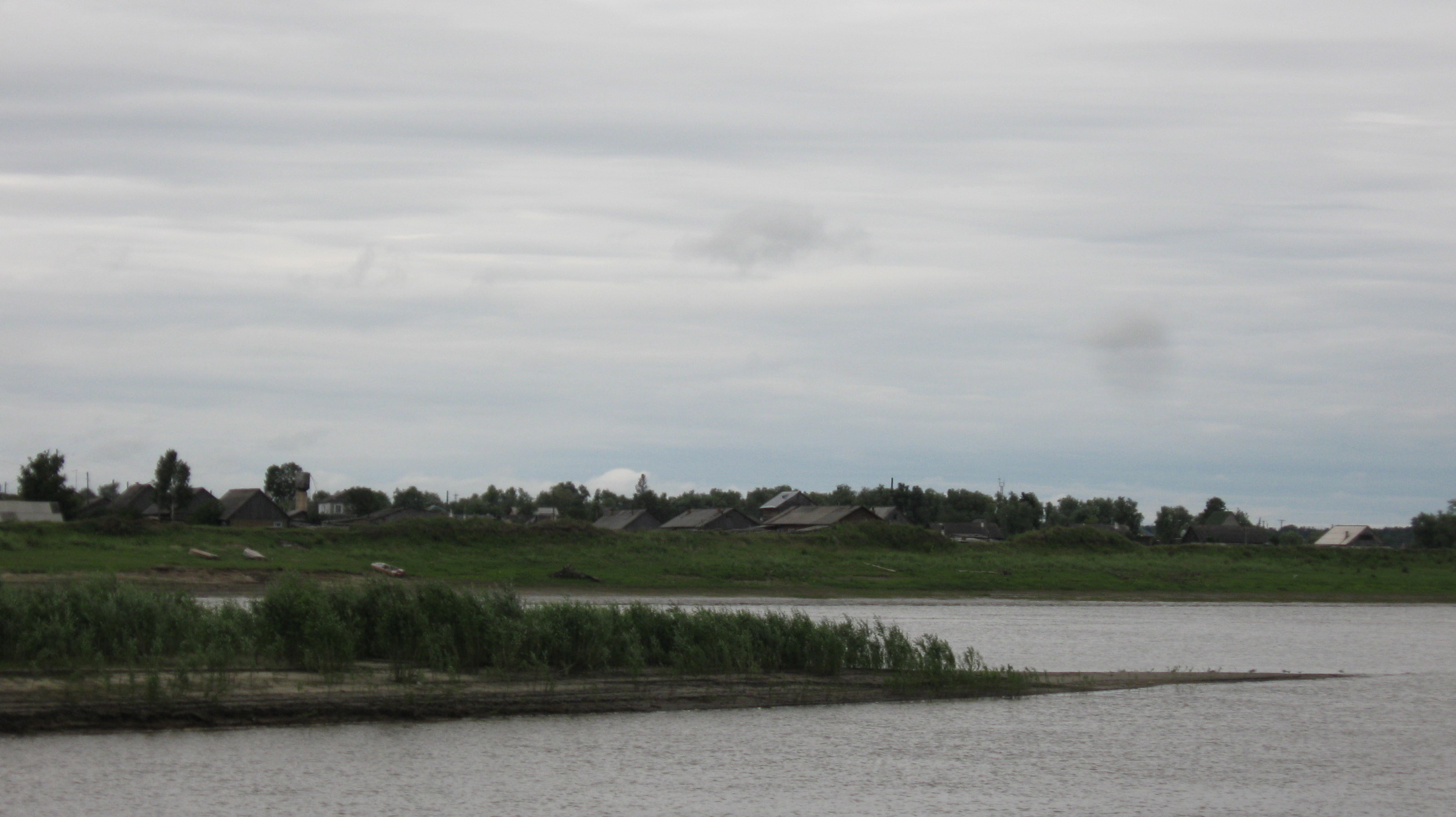
- Confluence of Siberian rivers - the Ishim flows into the Irtysh, at the village Ust-Ishim, in Ust-Ishimsky District

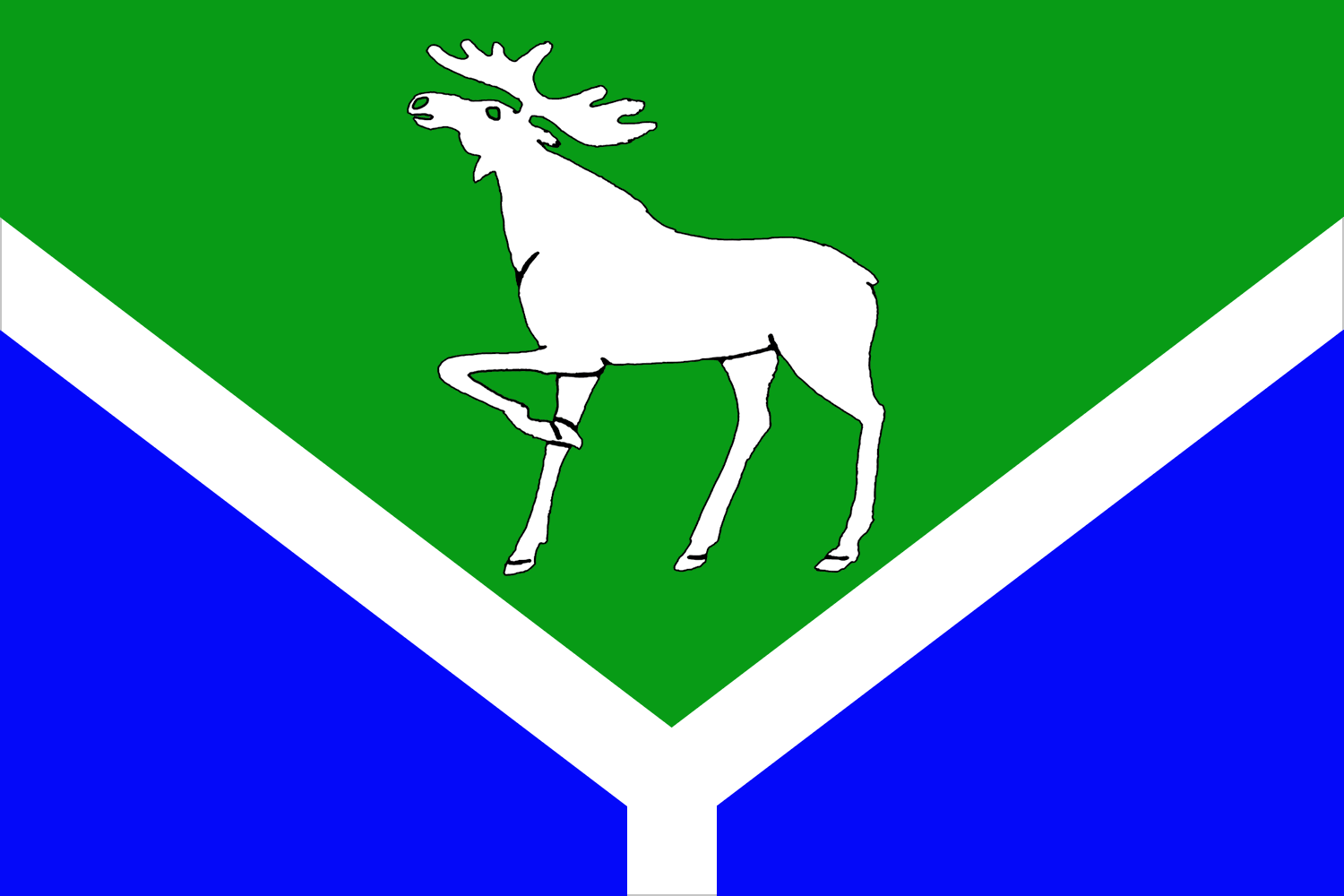
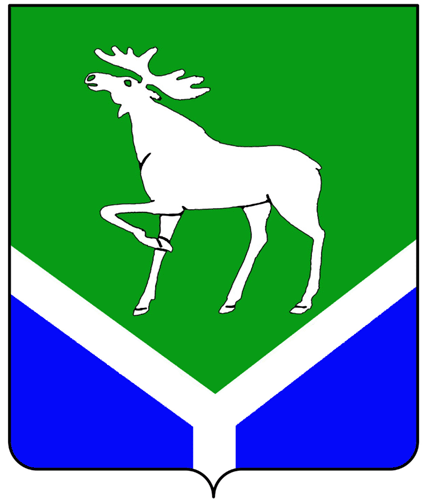
- Flag Coat of arms
- Location of Ust-Ishimsky District in Omsk Oblast
- Coordinates: 57°41′40″N 71°10′15″E
- Country: Russia
- Federal subject: Omsk Oblast
- Established: 25 May 1925
- Administrative center: Ust-Ishim

Area
  - Total: 7,846 km^{2} (3,029 sq mi)

Population (2010 Census)
  - Total: 13,480
  - Density: 1.718/km^{2} (4.450/sq mi)
  - Urban: 0%
  - Rural: 100%

Administrative structure
  - Administrative divisions: 13 rural okrug
  - Inhabited localities: 51 rural localities

Municipal structure
  - Municipally incorporated as: Ust-Ishimsky Municipal District
  - Municipal divisions: 0 urban settlements, 13 rural settlements
- Time zone: UTC+6 (MSK+3)
- OKTMO ID: 52657000
- Website: http://www.ust-ishim.narod.ru/

Ust-Ishimsky District (Russian: Усть-Иши́мский райо́н) is an administrative and municipal district (raion), one of the thirty-two in Omsk Oblast, Russia. It is located in the northwest of the oblast. The area of the district is 7,846 square kilometers (3,029 sq mi).} Its administrative center is the rural locality (a selo) of Ust-Ishim, which, as its name indicates, is located at the confluence of the Ishim River with the Irtysh.

Population: 13,480 (2010 Census); 16,479 (2002 census); 21,670 (1989 Soviet census). The population of Ust-Ishim accounts for 35.6% of the district's total population.

The Ust'-Ishim man, an ancient skeleton dated to 45,000 years before present, was discovered on the bank of the Irtysh River in Ust-Ishimsky District.

== Population ==
Russians 70.6%, Tatars 25.3%, Ukrainians 1.2%, Germans 1.1%, Chuvash 0.6%.

== Notable residents ==
- Vilis Krištopans (born 1954), Latvian politician, Prime Minister of Latvia 1998–1999
