= Shuidonggou =

Archaeological site in China

Coordinates: 38.29°N 106.505°E

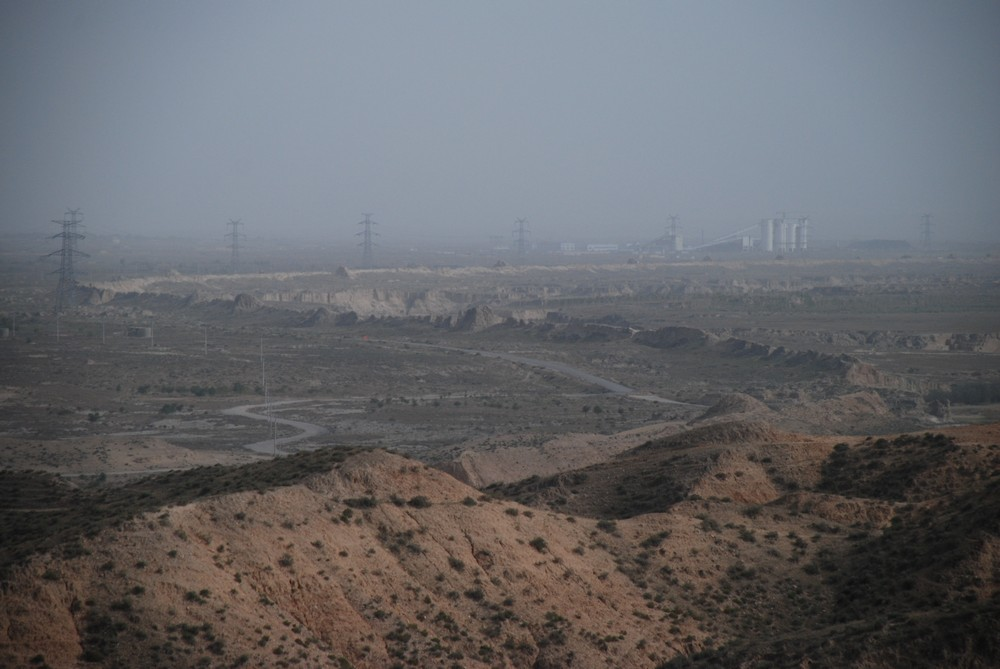
Shuidonggou section of the Great Wall (水洞沟)

Shuidonggou is an archaeological site and tourist attraction in Ordos, Yinchuan, Ningxia. It is the earliest paleolithic site in China, dating from over 30,000 years ago, and one of the AAAAA Tourist Attractions of China, a list of the most important and best-maintained tourist attractions in the People's Republic of China.

== History ==
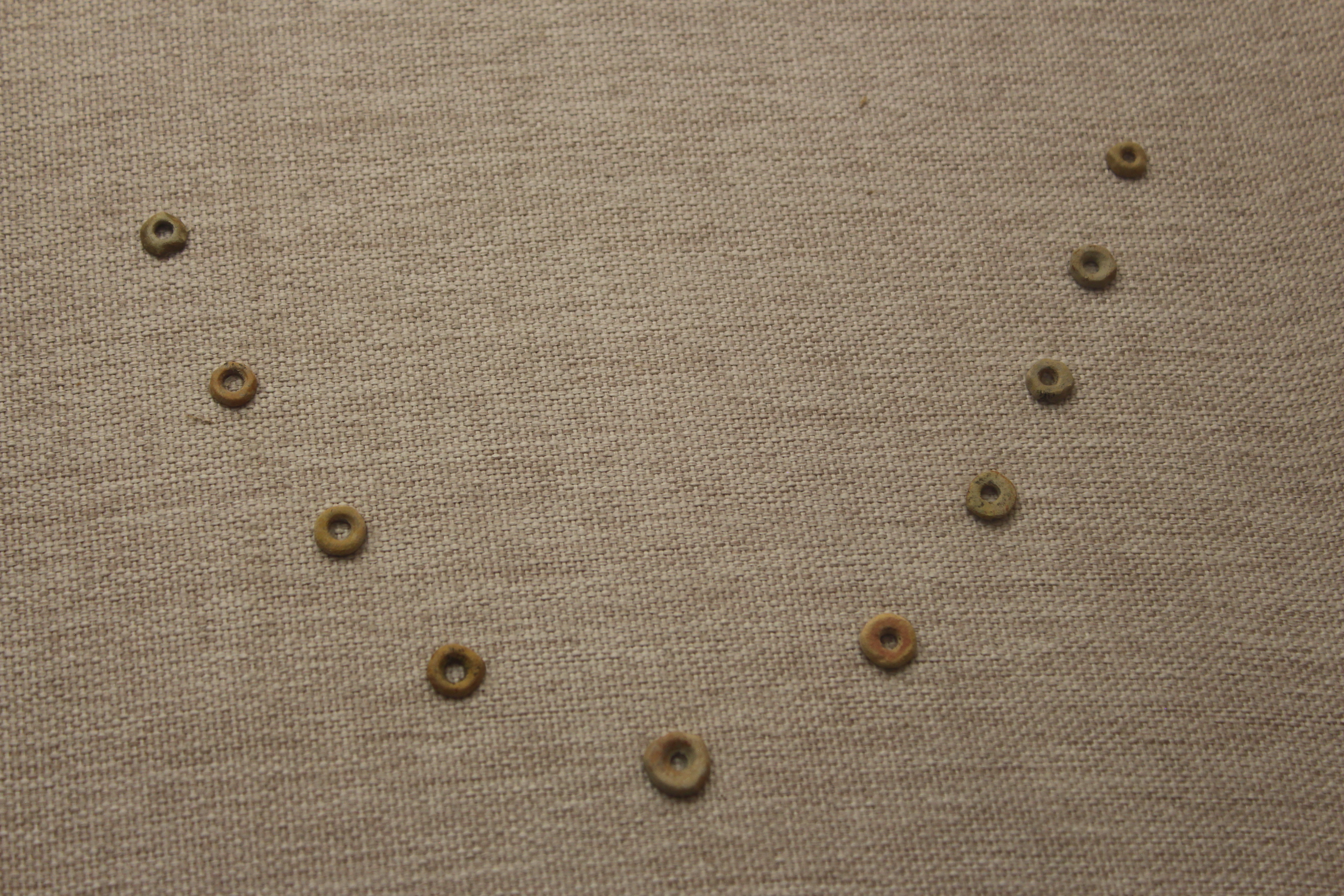
Ostrich eggshell ornaments from Shuidonggou, Paleozoological Museum of China

Human occupation of the site took place in the Late Pleistocene to Middle Holocene. Over 50,000 individual items have been collected from the site.

A section of the Great Wall of China lies within the site.

== Discovery ==
Émile Licent, a paleontologist from France, was the first to discover the site in 1920, finding a Rhinoceros fossil and stone tools. His discovery was followed up by a formal excavation in 1923 and successive excavations since.
