= Genetic history of East Asians =

This article summarizes the genetic makeup and population history of East Asian peoples and their connection to genetically related populations such as other Eastern Asians (Southeast Asians, North Asians), Indigenous Americans, Oceanians, Pacific Islanders and partly Central Asians and South Asians. They are collectively referred to as "East Eurasians" in population genomics.

== Overview ==
=== Origins ===
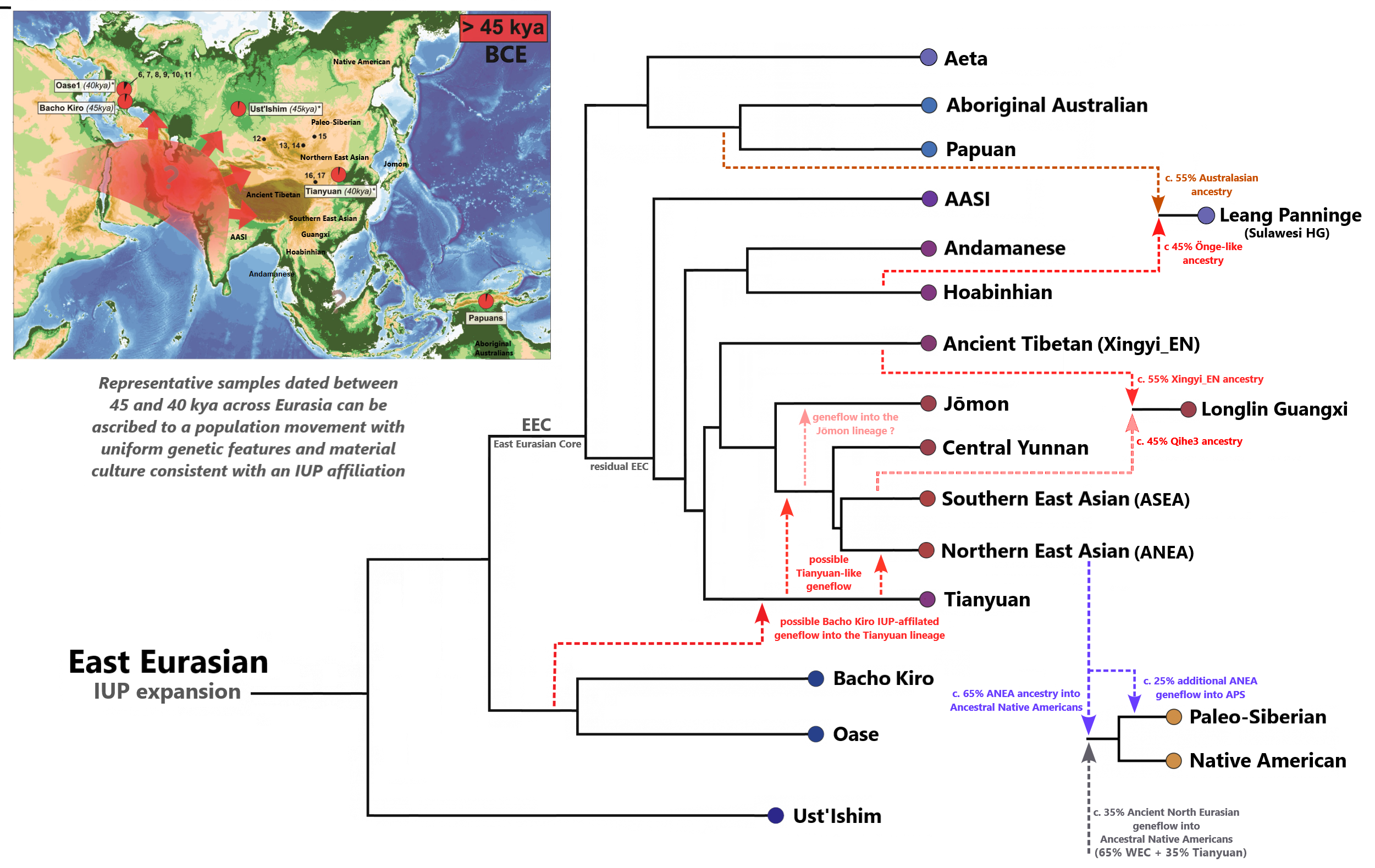
Phylogenetic position of East Asian lineages among other Eastern Eurasians.

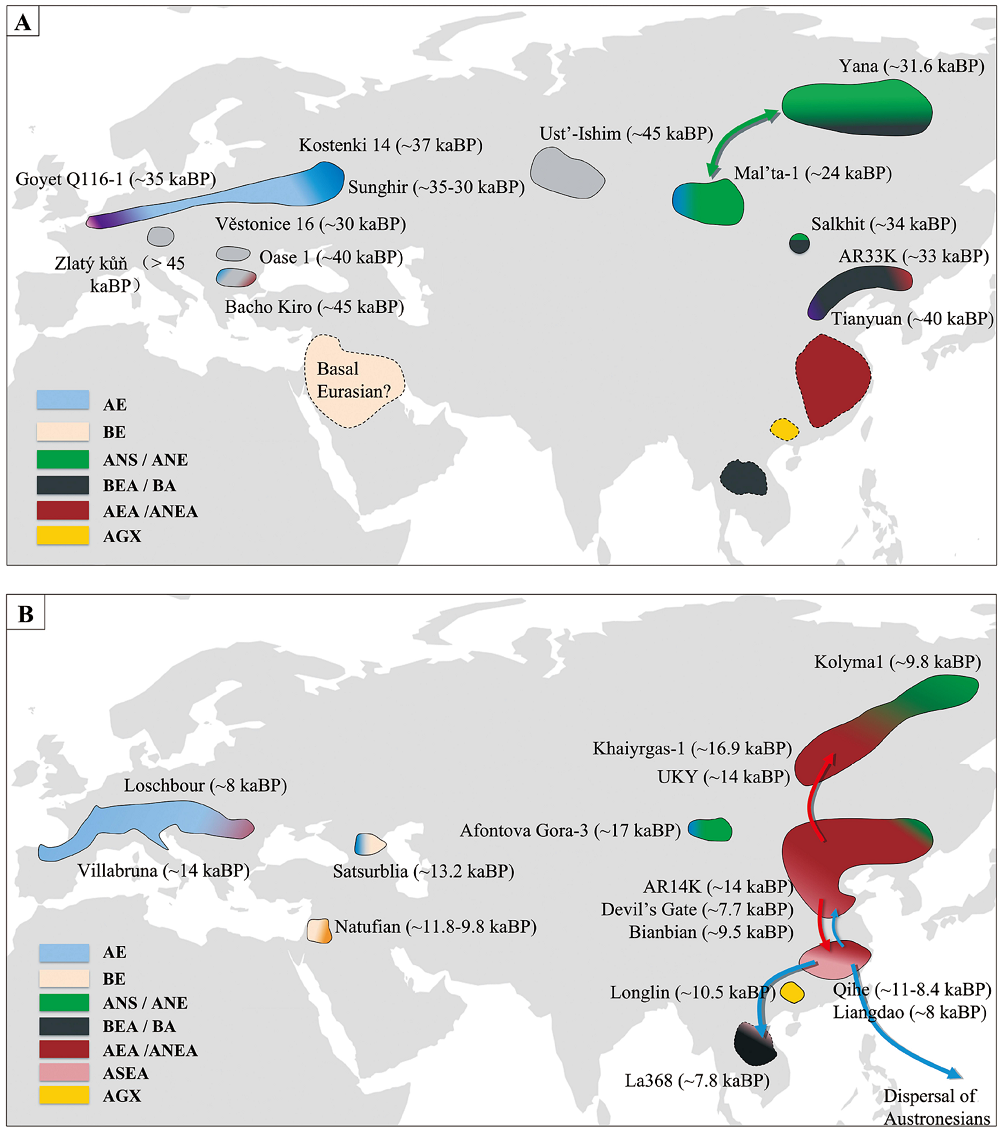
Schematic of populations in Eurasia from 45,000 to 10,000 years BP.

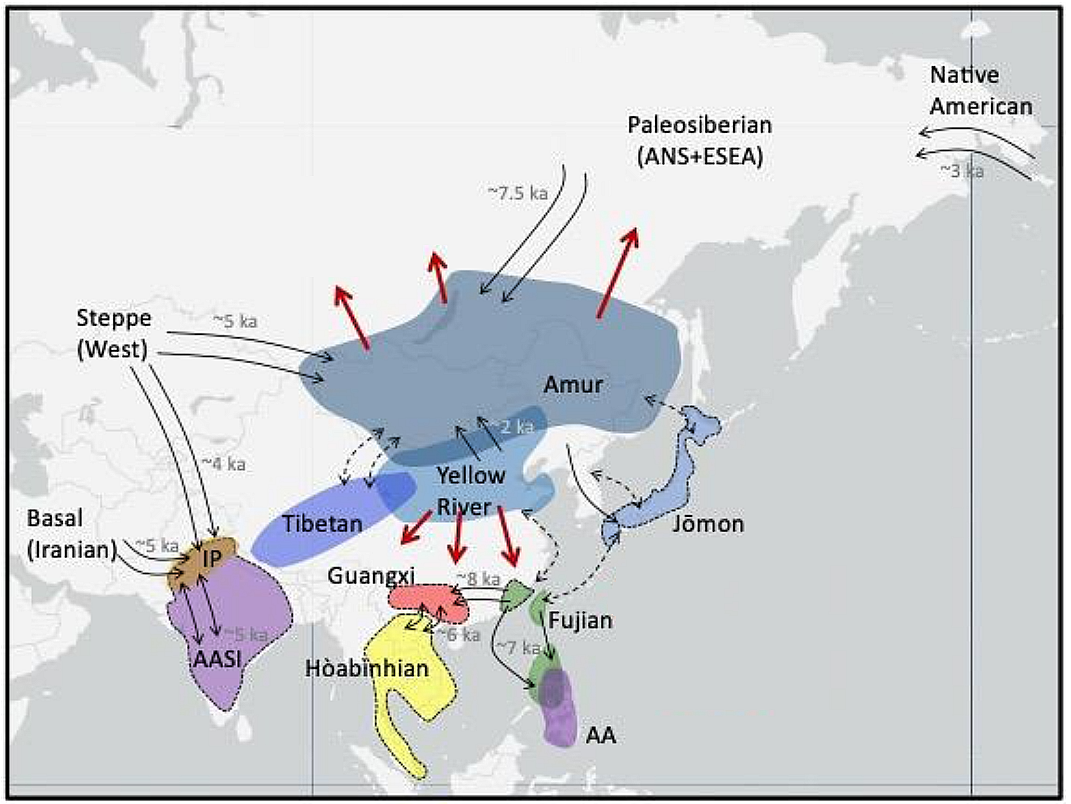
Highlighted regions show where ancient individuals associated with the labeled ancestry have been sampled.

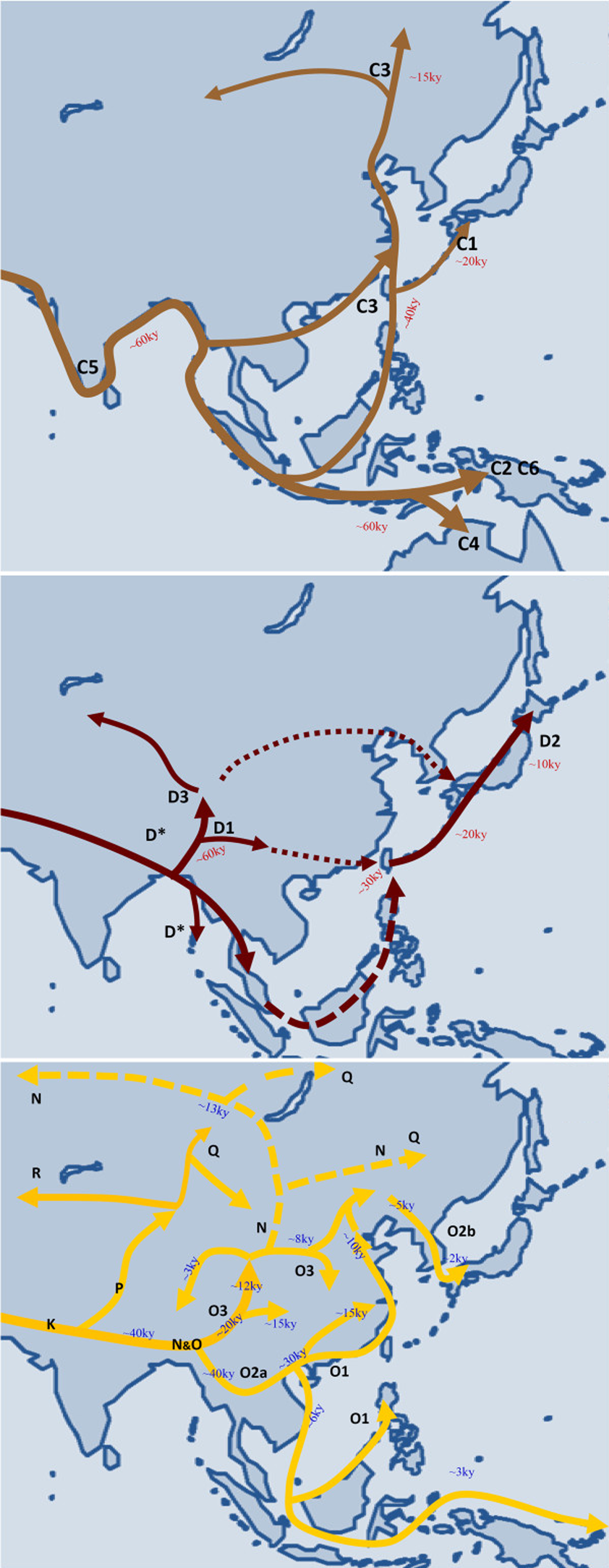
Proposed migration routes (Wang 2013) of dominant East Asian paternal haplogroups (C, D, N, and O), during the peopling of East Asia.

Population genomic research has studied the origin and formation of modern East Asians. The ancestors of East Asians (Ancient East Eurasians) split from Ancient West Eurasians possibly as early as 50,000 to 80,000 years ago. Possible routes into East Asia include a northern route from Central Asia, beginning north of the Himalayas, and a southern route, beginning south of the Himalayas and moving through South and Southeast Asia. Vallini et al. 2024 noted that the divergence between Ancient East Eurasians and West Eurasians most likely occurred on the Persian Plateau between 46,000 to 57,000 years ago. Gandini et al. 2025 proposed a "long chronology", which suggested an earlier settlement of Sahul by East Eurasians about 60,000 years ago. Their descendants are indigenous to Australia, New Guinea, and Oceania and are related to other East Eurasians instead of belonging to a separate wave.

Phylogenetic data suggests that an early Initial Upper Paleolithic wave (at least 45,000 years ago) "ascribed to a population movement with uniform genetic features and material culture" (Ancient East Eurasians) dispersed throughout Eurasia, with one of its main branches (dubbed as East Eurasian Core; EEC) using a dispersal route along the southern coastline of Asia, where they subsequently diverged rapidly into the ancestors of Australasians (Oceanians), the Ancient Ancestral South Indians (AASI), as well as Andamanese and East/Southeast Asians (ESEA), although Papuans may have also received some geneflow from an earlier group (xOoA), around 2%, next to additional archaic admixture in the Sahul region.

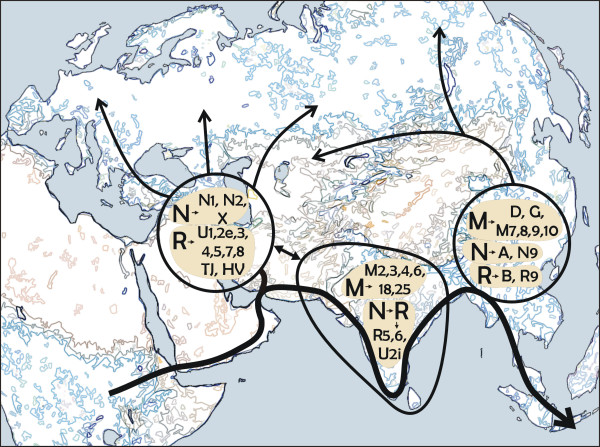
Proposed migration routes of maternal haplogroups during the peopling of Eurasia.

Deeply diverged Ancient East Eurasian lineages associated with the spread of IUP-affiliated material culture along an early northern route into eastern Europe (Bacho Kiro Cave and Peștera cu Oase), Central Asia (Ust'-Ishim man), and Siberia (Kara-Bom, etc.), as well as Northwest China, contributed little to no ancestry to modern East Asians, which instead were found to descend primarily from the southern route wave.

The single southern route dispersal into the South-Southeast Asia region gave rise to the AASI, Andamanese, Eastern Asian and Australasian populations. The southern route origin is strongly supported by archaeogenetic data and genetic affinities between these "East Eurasian Core" (EEC) populations. Although the morphological more distinct traits of modern Northeast Asian and Siberian populations raised the question of a possible distinct northern origin, those traits have subsequently been associated with adaptions to the extremely cold climate during the Last Glacial Maximum (LGM) of 24–16 kya by an ancient people with initially southern affinities, which moved into Northeast Asia and Siberia from Southeast Asia. This is further supported by higher morphological affinities of ancient East Asian specimens, such as the Tianyuan man, the Zhoukoudian Upper Cave remains, the Liujiang man, the Red Deer Cave people, the Jōmon people as well as the Liangdao and Qihe Cave remains to "southern" populations and ancient remains, such as the Niah cave and Wajak remains or Hoabinhians, as well as modern Andamanese, Vedda, and Aboriginal Australians, but being genetically closer or basal to the derived Northeast Asian and Siberian groups. Tianyuan-related populations were also found to have diverged directly after Papuans but other studies suggest a simultaneous split between the ancestors of Andamanese, Mainland Asians and Australasians. However, there is evidence that the Andamanese briefly shared genetic drift with the ancestors of Tianyuan-related populations before diverging. Groups like Papuans were also believed to have diverged from other East Eurasians before Tianyuan-related populations. Genetic differences between them and Tianyuan-related populations were likewise attributed to archaic hominin admixture.

Additionally, genetic diversity within present-day Asian populations, follows a strong correlation with latitude: genetic diversity is decreasing from south to north. The correlation continues to hold true when only mainland Southeast Asian and East Asian populations are considered. This may be attributable to a serial founder effect, and is consistent with a single eastward migration of modern humans along a southern route into South and Southeast Asia. Subsequently, ancestral East Asians diversified in southern East Asia and subsequently dispersed northward across the continent. The dominant paternal haplogroups of East Asians associated with the "southern route" belong to subclades of C-M217, D-M174, O-M175, and N-M231, among some others.

The exact patterns of the northwards dispersal of ancestral East Asians from Southeast Asia remains unclear. There may have been both an "interior route" and a "coastal route", correlating in part with the distribution and frequency of paternal haplogroup subclades. Accordingly, ancient and modern East Asians can be modeled as admixture between both a deeply branching interior lineage (represented by the Tianyuan specimen) and an equally deep branching coastal lineage (represented by present-day Önge peoples). The amounts of interior and coastal contributions vary depending on each model; while one study estimated 90% interior + 10% coastal contributions, others estimated between 21 and 26% interior + 74–79% coastal contributions, or nearly equal amounts of interior and coastal contributions (51–56% and 44–49% respectively). There are also alternative scenarios for the divergence patterns of ancient East Asians without a distinct interior–coastal dispersal. Wang et al. 2025 found further evidence for that ancient and present-day East Asians formed as admixture between two basal Asian sources, specifically between a lineage represented by the Xingyi_EN specimen, and a lineage represented by the Tianyuan specimen.

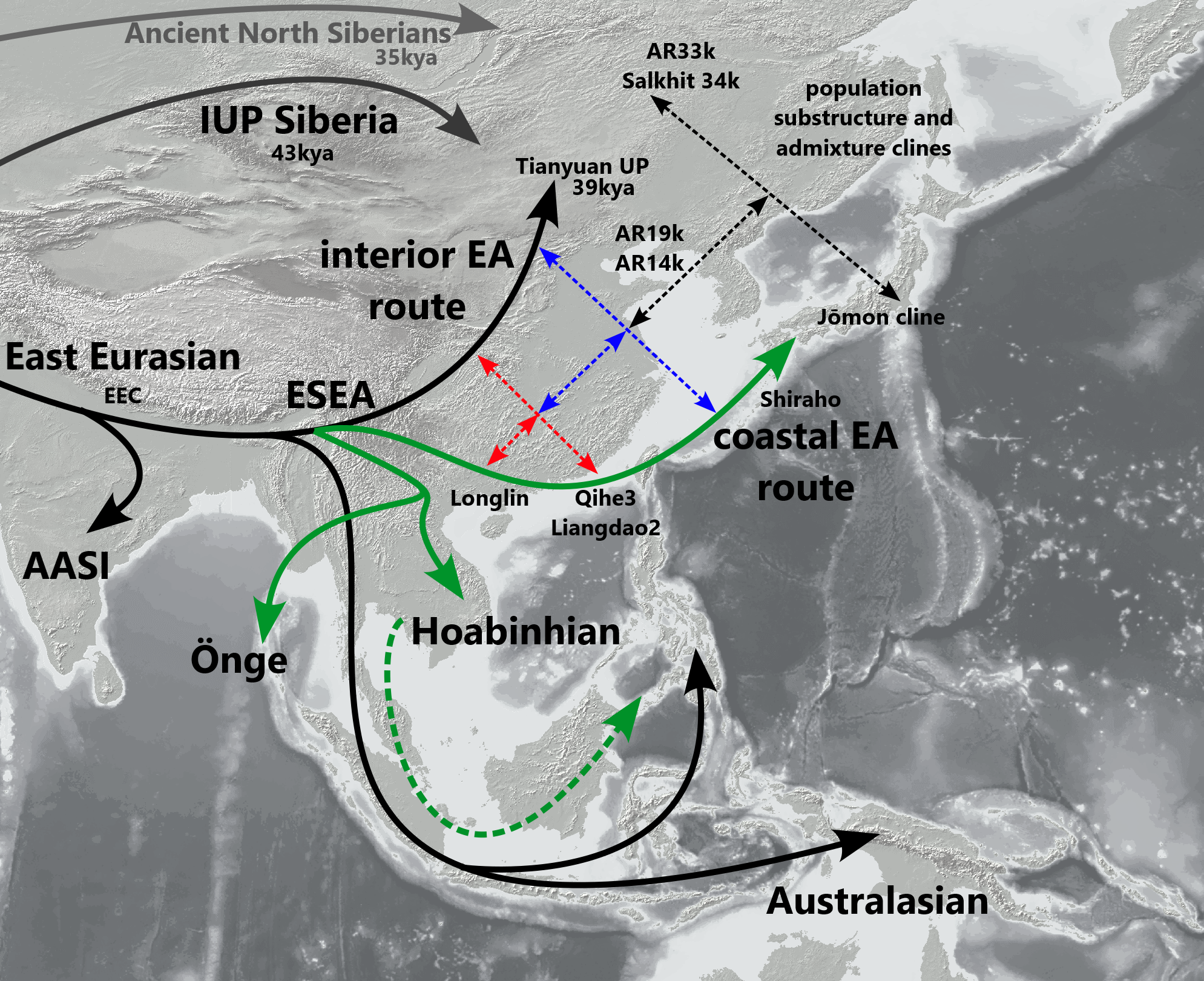
Scenario on the peopling of Eastern Asia via an interior and coastal dispersal northwards.

There is also genetic evidence for migrations to Northern Asia and Siberia from both a deeply diverged East Eurasian Initial Upper Paleolithic group (related to the Ust'-Ishim man and or the Bacho Kiro cave remains) via Central Asia, which may have contributed ancestry (up to 39%) to the Tianyuan lineage (with the remainder 61% being from an Onge-like source), and from a later Upper Paleolithic West Eurasian-affiliated source, which contributed to the formation of Ancient North Eurasians (ANE/ANS). While the southern migration wave likely diversified after settling within East Asia, the wave associated with Upper Paleolithic Europeans mixed with the southern wave somewhere in Siberia. The ANE derive around 2/3 (50–71%) of their ancestry from a West Eurasian-like source best represented by Upper Paleolithic Europeans, and around 1/3 (29–50%) from an East Eurasian source best represented by the Tianyuan man or Upper Paleolithic East/Southeast Asians. The legacy of this Paleolithic admixture event is also evident by the later dispersal of haplogroups Q and R, as well as ANE-like ancestry throughout Northern Eurasia, but which had only limited influence on modern East Asian groups. However, there is significant genetic input from North Eurasian hunter-gatherers, who lived about 10–4 kya and are characterized by distinct West and East Eurasian admixture, into ancient and present Uralic and Yeniseian-speaking populations. Uralic-speaking populations were also responsible for spreading haplogroup N throughout Eurasia. For Turkic, Mongolic and Tungusic-speaking populations and Late Bronze and Iron Age pastoralists such as Scythians, Sarmatians and Xiongnu, there is limited input from these hunter-gatherers. Other studies also detect notable ANE input in ancient northern Chinese populations via Ancient Paleo-Siberian-related populations.

Although Huang et al. (2021) found evidence for light skin being selected among the ancestral populations of West Eurasians and East Eurasians, prior to their divergence, the main period for the selection of light skin alleles (such as rs1800414-G) started around 25,000 to 30,000 years ago in East Asia, after the northwards expansion from South Asia. The affiliated alleles are distinct from those observed among European/Middle Eastern populations.

In contrast to the demographic history of Europe, which was shaped by multiple geneflow events from the Middle East and Central Asia, the demographic history of Eastern Asia is characterized by genetic continuity of multiple inter-related Basal Asian lineages and only negligible influence from non-Asian lineages.

=== Diversification and substructure ===
After the peopling of the South and Southeast Asia region by the East Eurasian Core (EEC), this ancestral population diverged rapidly into at least three "deeply branching East Asian lineages, namely the "Ancient Ancestral South Indians" (AASI) staying in Southern Asia, Australasians (AA) heading into Oceania, and the East and Southeast Asian (ESEA) branch in Southeast Asia and subsequently expanding northwards. The ESEA branch would become broadly ancestral to modern East Asians, Southeast Asians, Polynesians, Siberians, and Native Americans. The ESEA source population is estimated to have expanded outgoing from Mainland Southeast Asia at c. 40,000 BCE. The deepest split among the ESEA lineage gave rise to the "Basal Asian" Hoabinhian hunter-gatherers of Southeast Asia, the Xingyi lineage in Southern China, and the c. 39,000-year-old Tianyuan lineage in Northern China and the Amur Region. This was followed by the divergence of the Jōmon lineage on the Japanese archipelago some 22,000 to 25,000 years ago. Then, finally the splitting of the Central Yunnan, Ancient Southern East Asians (ASEA), and Ancient Northern East Asians (ANEA) ancestries somewhere in East Asia over 19,000 years ago. ANEA ancestry replaced the earlier Tianyuan-like ancestry in Northern China, the Amur region, and parts of Siberia by at least 19,000 years ago. ASEA ancestry admixed with Xingyi ancestry to form the Longlin lineage at least 11,000 years ago, before ASEA ancestry replaced Longlin ancestry around 6,000 years ago in Southern China.

There are currently seven identified sub-ancestries on the ESEA branch:

- Ancient Northern East Asian (ANEA) – Associated with populations in the Amur River region, Mongolia, Siberia, as well as in the Yellow River region of central China. Early representatives of ANEA ancestry include the 19,000-year-old AR19K sample and 11,000-year-old Donghulin sample in Beijing, China. The ANEA lineage can be broadly divided into three subgroups: the "Ancient Northeast Asians" (ANA), "Neo-Siberians", and "Yellow River farmers". Sister lineage to ASEA.
- Ancient Southern East Asian (ASEA) – Associated with ancient samples in the Fujian and Guangxi region of Southern China. Sister lineage to ANEA.
- Central Yunnan ancestry – Ancestry associated with 5,500–1,400-year-old samples from the Xingyi site in central Yunnan. It is closer related to the ANEA and ASEA lineages than the Basal Asian lineages, but also distinct from them.
- Hoabinhian ancestry – Ancestry on the ESEA lineage associated with 8,000–4,000-year-old hunter-gatherers in Laos and Malaysia.
- Jōmon ancestry – Ancestry associated with 8,000–2,000-year-old individuals in the Japanese archipelago.
- Tianyuan ancestry – Ancestry on the ESEA lineage associated with an Upper Paleolithic individual dating to c. 39,000 years ago in Northern China.
- Xingyi ancestry – Ancestry associated with a 7,100-year-old Xingyi_EN individual from the Xingyi site in Yunnan. This lineage was a previously unidentified "ghost" population that contributed to the Early Ancient Tibetan (EAT) ancestry associated with a c. 6,000-year-old Zongri5.1K individual from the Tibetan Plateau.

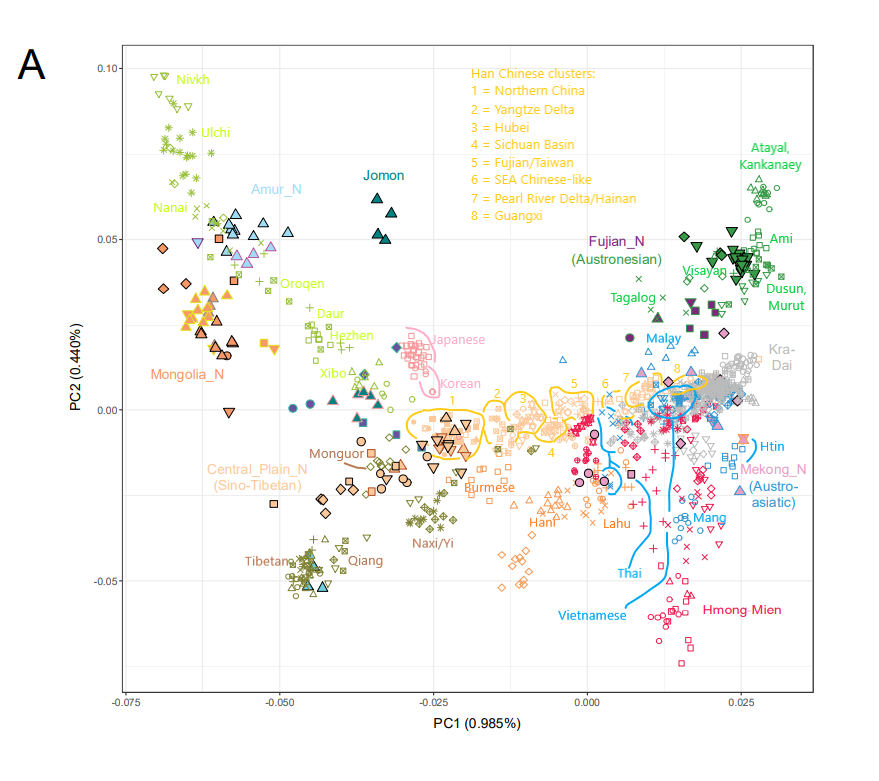
A population genomic PCA graph, showing the substructure of Eastern Asian populations.

The genetic makeup of contemporary East Asians, such as the Han Chinese, is primarily characterized by the presence of "Yellow River" ancestry, a subgroup of the Ancient Northern East Asians (ANEA). Yellow River ancestry is associated with a sample of a 9,500-year-old individual from the lower reaches of the Yellow River in Shandong, i.e. Bianbian. It formed either as admixture between a major Ancient Northern East Asian (ANEA) component and a minor Ancient Southern East Asian (ASEA) one, or as earlier admixture between a deep interior group (90%) and a deep coastal group (10%). Yellow River ancestry is distinct from the Ancient Northeast Asians (ANA), but branches deeply within Ancient Northern East Asian (ANEA). Yellow River ancestry, like most ANEA groups, display close affinities to the AR19K-related lineage.

Contemporary Northeast Asians such as Tungusic, Mongolic, and Turkic peoples derive most of their ancestry from the "Amur" Ancient Northeast Asian (ANA) subgroup of the Ancient Northern East Asians (ANEA), which expanded massively with millet cultivation and pastoralism. Tungusic peoples display the highest genetic affinity to Ancient Northeast Asians (ANA), represented by c. 7,000 and 13,000 year old specimens, whereas Turkic-speaking peoples have variable but significant amounts of West Eurasian admixture.

An early branch of Ancient Northern East Asians (ANEA) absorbed an Ancient North Eurasian (ANE) population to their north, giving rise to the Ancient Paleo-Siberians, who in turn became ancestral to both "modern Paleo-Siberians" (such as Chukotko-Kamchatkan, Yeniseian, and Nivkh speakers) and contemporary Native Americans. Paleo-Siberian (APS) ancestry was once widespread across North Asia, but largely replaced by later waves of Neo-Siberian ancestry due to a major population turnover from the south, possibly involving Uralic and Yukaghir speakers. This was later followed by another expansion from the south in relatively recent times, associated with Ancient Northeast Asian (ANA) ancestry involving Tungusic, Mongolic, and Turkic speakers.

Austronesians and Kra-Dai speakers in Southeast Asia mainly carry "Fujian Neolithic" ancestry, a subgroup of Ancient Southern East Asians (ASEA), which is associated with the spread of rice cultivation. A mixture of Xingyi ancestry (48.8 to 71.5%) and ASEA ancestry likely gave rise to the "Longlin" ancestry associated with an 11,000-year-old individual from Longlin, Guangxi.

In contrast to Austronesians, most Austroasiatic ethnic groups demonstrate greater genetic affinity with the Central Yunnan lineage than they do with Ancient Southern East Asians (ASEA). Central Yunnan ancestry is common across Austroasiatic speakers in Southeast Asia and Yunnan province, including the Mlabri people of Laos and Thailand, but is low to non-existent in the Austroasiatic speakers of South Asia. Isolated hunter-gatherers in Southeast Asia, such as the Semang, derive most of their ancestry from the Hoabinhian and Central Yunnan lineages.

== Ancient and historical populations ==
=== Hoabinhian ===
The Hoabinhians represent a technologically advanced society of hunter-gatherers, primarily living in Mainland Southeast Asia, but also adjacent regions of Southern China. While the Upper Paleolithic origins of this 'Hoabinhian ancestry' are unknown, Hoabinhian ancestry has been found to be related to the main 'East Asian' ancestry component found in most modern East and Southeast Asians, although deeply diverged from it. Together with the Paleolithic Tianyuan man and Xingyi lineage, they form early branches of East Asian genetic diversity, and are described as "Basal Asian" (BA) or "Basal East Asian" (BEA).

=== Jōmon people ===
The Jōmon represent the indigenous population of the Japanese archipelago during the Jōmon period. They are inferred to descend from the Paleolithic inhabitants of Japan. Genetic analyses on Jōmon remains found them to represent a deeply diverged East Asian lineage. The Jōmon lineage is inferred to have diverged from Ancient East Asians before the divergence between Ancient Northern East Asians (ANEA) and Ancient Southern East Asians (ASEA), but after the divergence of the basal Tianyuan man, Xinyi lineage, and Hoabinhians. Beyond their broad affinity with Eastern Asian lineages, the Jōmon also display a weak affinity for Ancient North Eurasians (ANE), which may be associated with the introduction of microblade technology to Northeast Asia and Northern East Asia during the Last Glacial Maximum via the ANE or Ancient Paleo-Siberians. Other studies find ANE ancestry in Jōmon to be unlikely.

=== Xianbei ===
A full genomic analysis performed on multiple Xianbei remains found the population to have derived primarily from the Ancient Northeast Asian (ANA) gene pool. A genetic study published in the American Journal of Physical Anthropology in August 2018 noted that the paternal haplogroup C2b1a1b has been detected among the Xianbei and the Rouran, and was probably an important lineage among the Donghu people. Genetic studies published in 2006 and 2015 revealed that the mitochondrial haplogroups of Xianbei remains were of East Asian origin. According to Zhou (2006) the maternal haplogroup frequencies of the Tuoba Xianbei were 43.75% haplogroup D, 31.25% haplogroup C, 12.5% haplogroup B, 6.25% haplogroup A and 6.25% "other". Zhou (2014) obtained mitochondrial DNA analysis from 17 Tuoba Xianbei, which indicated that these specimens were, similarly, completely East Asian in their maternal origins, belonging to haplogroups D, C, B, A, O and haplogroup G.

=== Xiongnu ===
The Xiongnu, possibly a Turkic, Mongolic, Yeniseian or multi-ethnic group, was a confederation of nomadic peoples who, according to ancient Chinese sources, inhabited the eastern Eurasian Steppe from the 3rd century BC to the late 1st century AD. Chinese sources report that Modu Chanyu, the supreme leader after 209 BC, founded the Xiongnu Empire.

==== Autosomal DNA ====
Important cultural, technological and political elements may have been transmitted by Eastern Iranian-speaking Steppe nomads: "Arguably, these Iranian-speaking groups were assimilated over time by the predominant Turkic-speaking part of the Xiongnu population". This is reflected by the average genetic makeup of Xiongnu samples, having approximately 58% East Eurasian ancestry, represented by a Bronze Age population from Khövsgöl, Mongolia, which may be associated with the Turkic linguistic heritage. The rest of the Xiongnu's ancestry (~40%) was related to West Eurasians, represented by the Gonur Depe BMAC population of Central Asia, and the Sintashta culture of the Western steppe. The Xiongnu displayed striking heterogeneity and could be differentiated into two subgroups, "Western Xiongnu" and "Eastern Xiongnu", with the former being of "hybrid" origins displaying affinity to previous Saka tribes, such as represented by the Chandman culture, while the later was of primarily Ancient Northeast Asian (ANA; Ulaanzuukh-Slab Grave) origin. High status Xiongnu individuals tended to have less genetic diversity, and their ancestry was essentially derived from the Eastern Eurasian Ulaanzuukh or Slab Grave culture.

==== Paternal and Maternal lineages ====
In 2012, Chinese researchers published an analysis of the paternal haplogroups of 12 elite Xiongnu male specimens from Heigouliang in Xinjiang, China. Six of the specimens belonged to Q1a, while four belonged to Q1b-M378. 2 belonged to unidentified clades of Q*. In another study, DA39, a probable Chanyu of the Xiongnu empire was assigned to haplogroup R1. Högström et al. (2024) later reassigned DA39 to haplogroup R-Y56311. A review of the available research has shown that, as a whole, 53% of Xiongnu paternal haplogroups were East Eurasian, while 47% were West Eurasian. The authors observed that this contrasts strongly with the preceding Slab Grave period, which was dominated by East Asian patrilineages. They suggest that this may reflect an aggressive expansion of people with West Eurasian paternal haplogroups, or perhaps the practice of marriage alliances or cultural networks favoring people with Western patrilines.

The bulk of the genetics research indicates that, as a whole, 73% of Xiongnu maternal haplogroups were East Eurasian, while 27% were West Eurasian. A 2003 study found that 89% of Xiongnu maternal lineages from the Egiin Gol valley were of East Asian origin, while 11% were of West Eurasian origin. A 2016 study of Xiongnu from central Mongolia found a considerably higher frequency of West Eurasian maternal lineages, at 37.5%.

== Modern populations ==
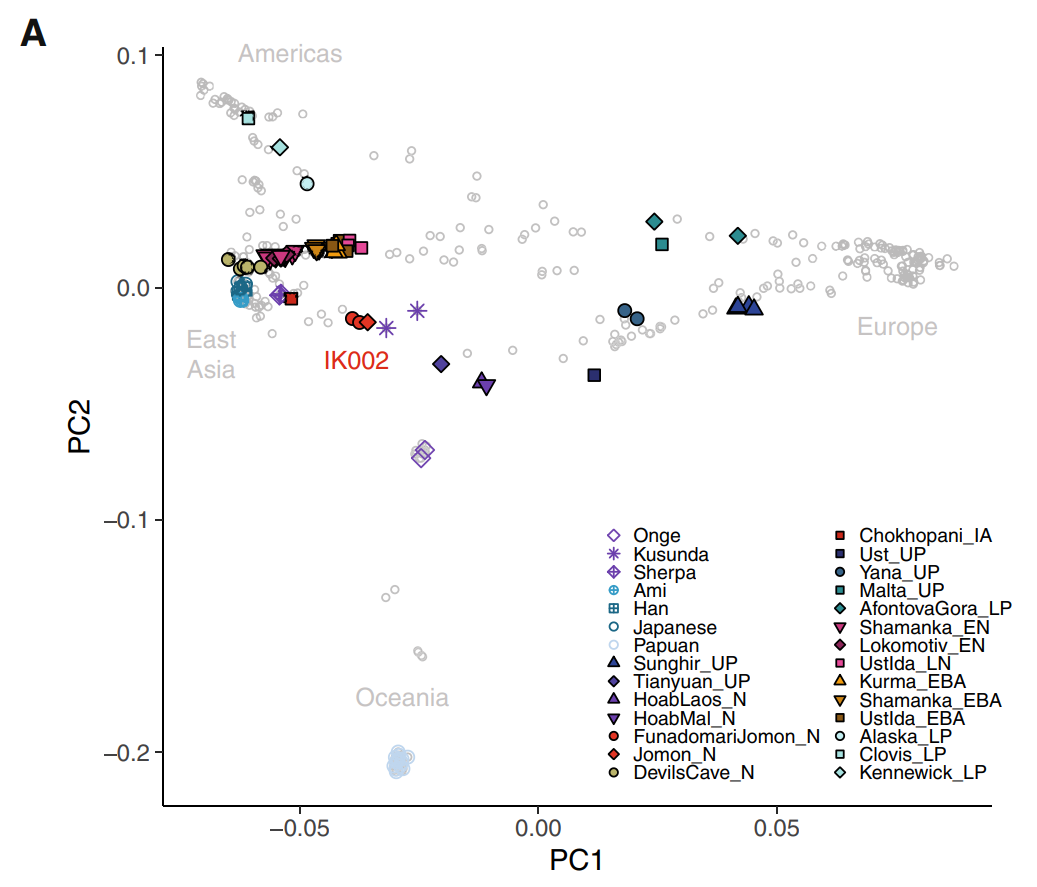
Genetic structure of present-day and ancient Eurasians.

=== Manchu people ===
A study on the Manchu population in Liaoning reported that they share a close genetic relationship with Northern Han Chinese. Their ancestry largely derives from a major ancestral component related to Yellow River farmers and a minor ancestral component linked to ancient populations from the Amur River Basin. The Manchu are therefore an exception to the typical genetic structure of Tungusic-speaking populations, likely due to the large-scale population migrations and genetic admixtures with the Northern Han Chinese in the past centuries.

==== Paternal lineages ====
The Manchu people display a significant amount of haplogroup C-M217, but the most often observed Y-DNA haplogroup among present-day Manchus is Haplogroup O-M122, which they share in common with the general population of China.

=== Japanese people ===
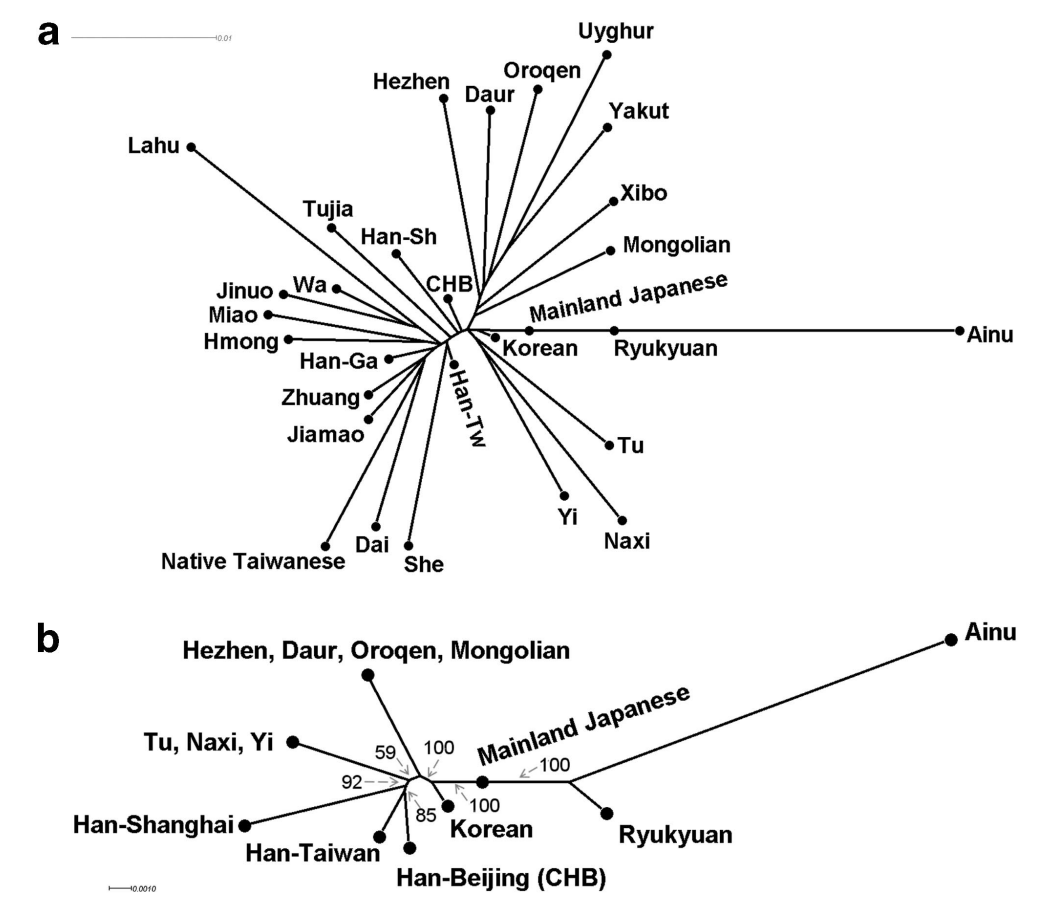
Phylogenetic tree of Ainu, Ryukyuan, Mainland Japanese, and other Asian ethnic groups. The Ainu and the Ryukyuan were clustered with 100% bootstrap probability, followed by the Mainland Japanese. The three populations in the Japanese archipelago clustered with the Korean with 100% bootstrap probability.

Japanese populations in modern Japan can be traced to three separate, but related demographics: the Ainu, Ryukyuan and Mainland Japanese (Yamato). The three populations are closely related to clusters found in Northeastern Asia with the Ainu group being most similar to the Ryukyuan group, followed by the Yamato group.

==== Ainu people ====
The exact origins of the early Ainu remains unclear, but it is generally agreed to be linked to the Satsumon culture of the Epi-Jōmon period, with later influences from the nearby Okhotsk culture. The Ainu are the population most genetically related to the ancient Jōmon peoples of Japan. The genetic makeup of the Ainu represents a "deep branch of East Asian diversity". Compared to contemporary East Asian populations, the Ainu share "a closer genetic relationship with northeast Siberians". Genetically, the Ainu population possess the most Jōmon ancestry, reaching around 70% while the others remain 30% and below, making the Ainu people the group that resembles most of the ancient Jōmon population.

==== Ryukyuans ====
The Ryukyuans are a distinct genome-wide cluster within the Japanese people. Acting as the genetic intermediary between Ainu and Yamato, the Ryukyuans share more alleles with southern Jōmon hunter-gatherers than Yayoi agriculturalists and have about 28% Jōmon ancestry although other studies suggest that it is actually about 36% and 26.1%. The general consensus is that the Ryukyuans possess an average of 30% of Jōmon ancestry. This aligns with the theory that the Ainu and the Ryukyuans show stronger genetic affinity with each other than the Yamato Japanese due to the higher frequency of Jōmon ancestry. However, the discrepancy of its frequencies between Ainu and Ryukyuan is larger (70–30%) than the discrepancy between Ryukyuan and Yamato (30–10%), making the latter two more genetically similar when not considering Jōmon ancestry.

==== Yamato people ====
Known as the "Mainland" group, the Yamato Japanese is the ethnic group that comprises over 98% of the population of Japan. Genetic and anthropometric studies have shown that the Yamato people predominantly descend from the Yayoi people, who migrated to Japan from the continent beginning of the 1st millennium BC, and to a lesser extent the indigenous Jōmon people who had inhabited the Japanese archipelago for millennia prior. Anthropologically, the Yamato people are almost identical to Toraijins, immigrants from ancient Korea who brought new technology entered after the late-Yayoi/Kofun period, who show most similarities with modern Koreans among other East Asian people. The majority of Yamato Japanese genetic ancestry is derived from sources related to other mainland Asian groups, mostly Koreans, while the other amount is derived from the local Jōmon hunter-gatherers (9% ±3%) and is considered as the most "continental" out of the three demographics.

===== Autosomal DNA =====
Evidence for both Northern and Southern mtDNA and Y-DNA haplogroups has been observed in the Japanese, with the North-Eastern DNA taking up majority of the genetic makeup, especially among the Mainland group. In addition to the Northeastern ancestry, the Japanese demographics (alongside the Koreans), are the only ethnicities to have restricted presence of the Jōmon-like M7a DNA [ja] in East Asia.

===== Paternal lineages =====
A comprehensive study of worldwide Y-DNA diversity (Underhill et al. 2000) included a sample of 23 males from Japan, of whom 35% belonged to haplogroup D-M174, 26% belonged to O-M175, 22% belonged to O-M122, 13% belonged to C-M8 and C-M130, and 4.3% belonged to N-M128. Poznik et al. (2016) reported the haplogroups of a sample of Japanese men from Tokyo: 36% belonged to D2-M179, 32% had O2b-M176, 18% carried O3-M122, 7.1% carried C1a1-M8, 3.6% belonged to O2a-K18, and 3.6% carried C2-M217.

===== Maternal lineages =====
According to an analysis of the 1000 Genomes Project's sample of Japanese collected in the Tokyo metropolitan area, the mtDNA haplogroups found among modern Japanese include D (35.6%), B (13.6%), M7 (10.2%), G (10.2%), N9 (8.5%), F (7.6%), A (6.8%), Z (3.4%), M9 (2.5%), and M8 (1.7%).

=== Koreans ===
Korean populations in modern Korea can be traced to many origins from the people of the Jeulmun period, Mumun period to the Samhan people and Yemaek people. Modern Koreans are related to other populations found in Northeast Asia, however according to recent studies, ancient Koreans included populations related to the Yayoi people, Jōmon people, Siberian influx, etc. Anthropologically, modern Koreans show strong genetic resemblance with other Northeast Asian populations such as the Yamato Japanese, as well as populations found in Manchuria and in northern China, especially among ethnic Koreans in the region.

==== Autosomal DNA ====
Generally speaking, modern Koreans' genetic ancestry is mostly dominated by Northeast Asian DNA with a small mix of Southern Jōmon-like ancestry (6% ±3%). Evidence for both Northern and Southern mtDNA and Y-DNA haplogroups has been observed in Koreans, similar to the Japanese, with the latter also being the closest group to the Koreans in the approximate region due to the overlap of Northeastern DNA and the presence of Jōmon-like M7a haplogroup [ja]. It is believed that the Jōmon-like ancestry was prominent during Neolithic period of Korea with percentage as high as 34% (±7%), but diminished over time due to incoming populations from the north.

Ancient genome comparisons revealed that the genetic makeup of Koreans can be suggested as a plausible admixture between Northeast Asian peoples and an influx of Southeast Asian peoples. This is supported by archaeological, historical and linguistic evidence, which suggests that the direct ancestors of Koreans were proto-Koreans who inhabited the northeastern region of China (situated near the Liao River) and the northern part of the Korean peninsula during the Neolithic (8,000–1,000 BC) and Bronze (1,500–400 BC) Ages, who later mixed with the Jōmon-like natives in the southern part of the peninsula before the Three Kingdoms period of Korea.

==== Paternal lineages ====
Studies of polymorphisms in the human Y-chromosome have so far produced evidence to suggest that the Korean people have a long history as a distinct, mostly endogamous ethnic group, with successive waves of people moving to the peninsula and three major Y-chromosome haplogroups. A majority of Koreans belong to subclades of haplogroup O-M175 (ca. 79% in total, with about 42% to 44% belonging to haplogroup O2-M122, about 31% to 32% belonging to haplogroup O1b2-M176, and about 2% to 3% belonging to haplogroup O1a-M119), while a significant minority belong to subclades of haplogroup C2-M217 (ca. 12% to 13% in total). Other Y-DNA haplogroups, including haplogroup N-M231, haplogroup D-M55, and haplogroup Q-M242, are also found in smaller proportions of present-day Koreans.

==== Maternal lineages ====
Studies of Korean mitochondrial DNA lineages have shown that there is a high frequency of Haplogroup D4, followed by haplogroup B, and then haplogroup A and haplogroup G. Haplogroups with lower frequency include N9, Y, F, D5, M7, M8, M9, M10, M11, R11, C, and Z.

=== Mongolic peoples ===
The ethnogenesis of Mongolic peoples is largely linked with the expansion of Ancient Northeast Asians (ANA). They subsequently came into contact with other groups, notably Sinitic peoples to their South and Western Steppe Herders to their far West. The Mongolians pastoralist lifestyle, may in part be derived from the Western Steppe Herders, but without much geneflow between these two groups, suggesting cultural transmission. The Mongols are believed to be the descendants of the Xianbei and the proto-Mongols. The former term includes the Mongols proper (also known as the Khalkha Mongols), Oirats, the Kalmyk people and the Southern Mongols. The latter comprises the Abaga Mongols, Abaganar, Aohans, Baarins, Gorlos Mongols, Jalaids, Jaruud, Khishigten, Khuuchid, Muumyangan and Onnigud. The Daur people are descendants of the para-Mongolic Khitan people.

==== Paternal lineages ====
The majority of Mongols in Mongolia and Russia belong to subclades of haplogroup C-M217, followed by lower frequency of O-M175 and N-M231. A minority belongs to haplogroup Q-M242, and a variety of West Eurasian haplogroups. A plurality of Daur males belong to haplogroup C-M217 (12/39 = 30.8% according to Xue Yali et al. 2006, 88/207 = 42.5% according to Wang Chi-zao et al. 2018), with haplogroup O-M122 being the second most common haplogroup among present-day Daurs (10/39 = 25.6%, 52/207 = 25.1%). There are also tribes (hala; cf. Kazakh tribes) among the Daurs that belong predominantly to other Y-DNA haplogroups, such as haplogroup N-M46/M178 (Merden hala) and haplogroup O1b1a1a-M95 (Gobulo hala). Haplogroup C3b2b1*-M401(xF5483) has been identified as a possible marker of the Aisin Gioro and is found in ten different ethnic minorities in Northern China, but is less prevalent from Han Chinese.

Research published in 2016 suggested that Genghis possibly belonged to the haplogroup R1b (R1b-M343). Five bodies, dating from about 1130–1250, were found in graves in Tavan Tolgoi, Mongolia. The authors suggested they were members of the Golden Family, and linked the spread of R1b-M343 to the former territories of the Mongol Empire. The authors also suggested that the Tavan Tolgoi bodies are related either to the female lineages of Genghis Khan's Borjigin clan, or to Genghis Khan's male lineage, rather than the Ongud clan.

==== Maternal lineages ====
The maternal haplogroups are diverse but similar to other northern Asian populations, including haplogroups D, C, B, and A, which are shared among indigenous American and Asian populations. West Eurasian mtDNA haplogroups makes up some minority percentages. Haplogroups HV, U, K, I, and J have been found in samples of Mongolic peoples.

=== Han Chinese ===
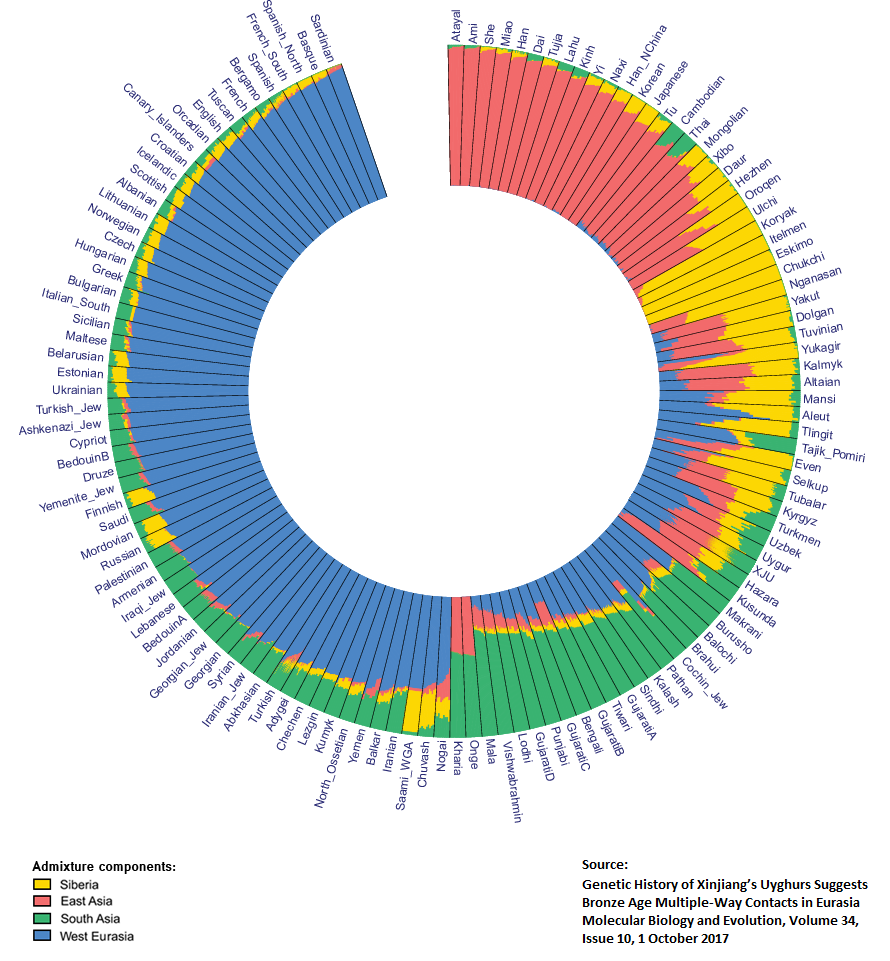
Estimated ancestry components among modern Eurasian populations. The colored components represent the distinctive genetic markers characteristic of people with red representing East Asian ancestry, Yellow for Siberian ancestry, green for South Asian ancestry, and blue for West Eurasian ancestry.

The origins of the Han Chinese primarily trace back to Neolithic Yellow River farmers, who descended from Ancient Northern East Asians (ANEA), and Neolithic groups near the Yangtze, who descended from Ancient Southern East Asians (ASEA). Today's modern Han Chinese can be colloquially categorized into two subgroups, Northern and Southern Han Chinese, although it is a clinal population with no significant distinction. The Han Chinese cluster retains a level of singularity with its admixture of ANEA and ASEA ancestries which is unique to the group with Southern Han having dual ancestry from Northern Han and southern non-Han natives. Compared to other East Asian populations, the Northern Han Chinese cluster is placed closer to the "Korean/Mainland Japanese" cluster in terms of a correlative genetic relationship (mostly due to the overlap of ANEA), but is also quite distinguishable from them genetically, due to the presence of ASEA ancestry and the absence of Jōmon ancestry. The Southern Han Chinese also share more alleles with Thai and other Kra–Dai peoples according to principal component analysis than Northern Han Chinese.

The genetic makeup of the modern Han Chinese is not purely uniform in terms of physical appearance and biological structure due to the vast geographical expanse of China and the migratory percolations that have occurred throughout it over the last few millennia. This has also engendered the emergence and evolution of the diverse multiplicity of assorted Han subgroups found throughout the various regions of modern China today. Comparisons between the Y chromosome single-nucleotide polymorphisms (SNPs) and mitochondrial DNA (mtDNA) of modern Northern Han Chinese and 3000 year old Hengbei ancient samples from China's Central Plains show that they are extremely similar to each other. These findings demonstrate that the core fundamental structural basis that shaped the genetic makeup of the present-day Northern Han Chinese was already formed more than three thousand years ago.

Studies of DNA remnants from the Central Plains area of China 3000 years ago show close affinity between that population and those of Northern Han today in both the Y-DNA and mtDNA. Both Northern and Southern Han show similar Y-DNA genetic structure.

Northern Han Chinese populations also have very minor autosomal West Eurasian admixture, especially Han Chinese populations in northern and central Shaanxi (~2%–4.6%) and Liaoning (~2%). This minor autosomal West Eurasian in northwestern Han is restricted to Gansu, Ningxia and northern Shaanxi (Shaanbei) and Guanzhong, but is not found in southern Shaanxi below in the Qinling mountains in Ankang and Hanzhong. During the Zhou dynasty, or earlier, peoples with paternal haplogroup Q-M120 also contributed to the ethnogenesis of Han Chinese people. In modern China, haplogroup Q-M120 can be found in the northern and eastern regions. Other studies say it has been found at low frequency in samples of Han Chinese.

Other Y-DNA haplogroups that have been found with notable frequency in samples of Han Chinese include O-P203 (15/165 = 9.1%, 217/2091 = 10.38%, 47/361 = 13.0%), C-M217 (10/168 = 6.0%, 27/361 = 7.5%, 176/2091 = 8.42%, 187/1730 = 10.8%, 20/166 = 12.0%), N-M231 (6/166 = 3.6%, 94/2091 = 4.50%, 18/361 = 5.0%, 117/1729 = 6.8%, 17/165 = 10.3%), O-M268(xM95, M176) (78/2091 = 3.73%, 54/1147 = 4.7%, 8/168 = 4.8%, 23/361 = 6.4%, 12/166 = 7.2%), and Q-M242 (2/168 = 1.2%, 49/1729 = 2.8%, 61/2091 = 2.92%, 12/361 = 3.3%, 48/1147 = 4.2%).

However, the mtDNA of Han Chinese increases in diversity as one looks from Northern to Southern China, which suggests that the influx of male Han Chinese migrants intermarried with the local female non-Han aborigines after arriving in what is now modern-day Guangdong, Fujian, and other regions of Southern China. Despite this, tests comparing the genetic profiles of Northern Han, Southern Han, and non-Han southern natives determined that haplogroups O1b-M110, O2a1-M88 and O3d-M7, which are prevalent in non-Han southern natives, were only observed in some Southern Han Chinese (4% on average), but not in the Northern Han genetic profile. Therefore, this proves that the male contribution of the southern non-Han natives in the Southern Han genetic profile is limited, assuming that the frequency distribution of Y lineages in southern non-Han natives represents that prior to the expansion of Han culture two thousand years ago from the north.

A recent, and to date the most extensive, genome-wide association study of the Han population, shows that geographic-genetic stratification from north to south has occurred and centrally placed populations act as the conduit for outlying ones. Ultimately, with the exception in some ethnolinguistic branches of the Han Chinese, such as Pinghua and Tanka people, there is a "coherent genetic structure" found in the entirety of the modern Han Chinese populace. Although admixture proportions can vary according to geographic region, the average genetic distance between various Han Chinese populations is much lower than between European populations, for example.

==== Autosomal DNA ====
A 2018 study calculated pairwise F_{ST} (a measure of genetic difference) based on genome-wide SNPs, among the Han Chinese (Northern Han from Beijing and Southern Han from Hunan, Jiangsu and Fujian provinces), Japanese and Korean populations sampled. It found that the smallest F_{ST} value was between Northern Han Chinese (Beijing) (CHB) and Southern Han (Hunan, Fujian, etc.) Chinese (CHS) (F_{ST[CHB-CHS]} = 0.0014), while CHB and Korean (KOR) (F_{ST[CHB-KOR]} = 0.0026) and between KOR and Japanese (JPT) (F_{ST[JPT-KOR]} = 0.0033). Generally, pairwise F_{ST} between Han Chinese, Japanese and Korean (0.0026~ 0.0090) are greater than that within Han Chinese (0.0014). These results suggested Han Chinese, Japanese and Korean are different in terms of genetic make-up, and the differences among the three groups are much larger than that between Northern and Southern Han Chinese. Nonetheless, there is also genetic diversity among the Southern Han Chinese. The genetic composition of the Han population in Fujian might not accurately represent that of the Han population in Guangdong.

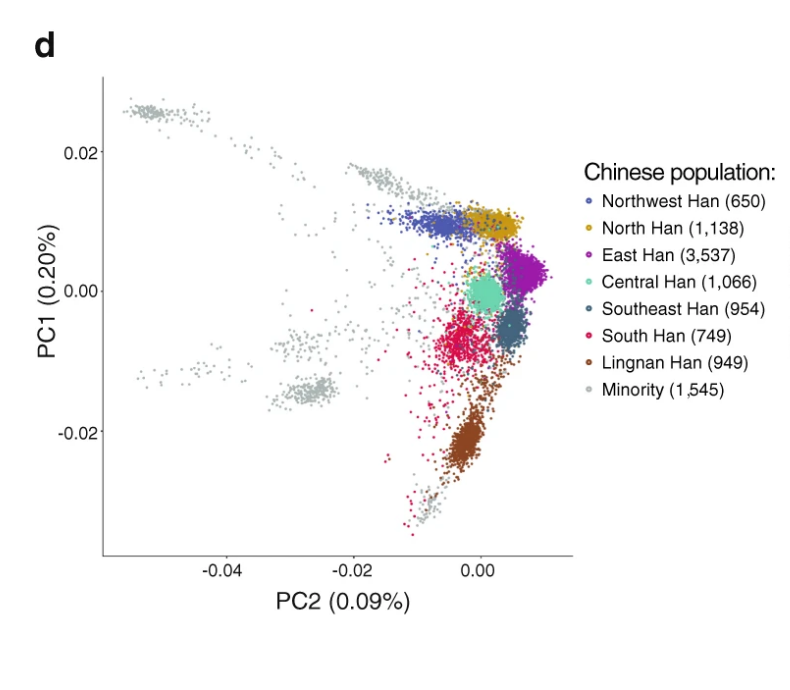
A PCA graph illustrates the genetic differences among Han Chinese groups.

Another study shows that the Northern and Southern Han Chinese are genetically close to each other and it finds that the genetic characteristics of present-day Northern Han Chinese were already formed prior to three thousand years ago in the Central Plain area.

A recent genetic study on the remains of people (~4,000 years BP) from the Mogou site in the Gansu-Qinghai (or Ganqing) region of China revealed more information on the genetic contributions of these ancient Di-Qiang people to the ancestors of the Northern Han. It was deduced that 3,300 to 3,800 years ago some Mogou people had merged into the ancestral Han population, resulting in the Mogou people being similar to some Northern Han in sharing up to ~33% paternal (O3a) and ~70% maternal (D, A, F, M10) haplogroups. The mixing ratio was possibly 13–18%.

The estimated contribution of Northern Han to Southern Han is substantial in both paternal and maternal lineages and a geographic cline exists for mtDNA. As a result, the Northern Han are one of the primary contributors to the gene pool of the Southern Han. However, it is noteworthy that the expansion process was not only dominated by males, as is shown by both contribution of the Y-chromosome and the mtDNA from Northern Han to Southern Han. Northern Han Chinese and Southern Han Chinese exhibit both Ancient Northern East Asian and Ancient Southern East Asian ancestries. These genetic observations are in line with historical records of continuous and large migratory waves of Northern China inhabitants escaping warfare and famine, to Southern China. Aside from these large migratory waves, other smaller southward migrations occurred during almost all periods in the past two millennia. A study by the Chinese Academy of Sciences into the gene frequency data of Han subpopulations and ethnic minorities in China showed that Han subpopulations in different regions are also genetically quite close to the local ethnic minorities, suggesting that in many cases, ethnic minorities ancestry had mixed with Han, while at the same time, the Han ancestry had also mixed with the local ethnic minorities.

Han Chinese, similar to other East Asian populations, have inherited West Eurasian ancestry, around 2.8% in Northern Han Chinese and around 1.7% in Southern Han Chinese, compared to the 2.2% West Eurasian ancestry in the Japanese and the 1.6% West Eurasian ancestry in the Korean people.

An extensive, genome-wide association study of the Han population in 2008, shows that geographic-genetic stratification from north to south has occurred and centrally placed populations act as the conduit for outlying ones. Ultimately, with the exception in some ethnolinguistic branches of the Han Chinese, such as Pinghua, there is "coherent genetic structure" (homogeneity) in all Han Chinese.

==== Paternal lineages ====
The major haplogroups of Han Chinese belong to subclades of Haplogroup O-M175. Y-chromosome O2-M122 is a common DNA marker in Han Chinese, as it appeared in China in prehistoric times, and is found in approximately 50% of Chinese males, with frequencies tending to be high toward the east of the country, ranging from 29.7% to 52% in Han from Southern and Central China, to 55–68% in Han from the eastern and northeastern China and Taiwan.

Other Y-DNA haplogroups that have been found with notable frequency in samples of Han Chinese include O-P203 (9.1–13.0%), C-M217 (6.0–12.0%), N-M231 (3.6–10.3%), O-M268(xM95, M176) (4.7–7%), and Q-M242 (2/168 = 1.2–4.2%).

==== Maternal lineages ====
The mitochondrial-DNA haplogroups of the Han Chinese can be classified into the Northern East Asian-dominating haplogroups, including A, C, D, G, M8, M9, and Z, and the Southern East Asian-dominating haplogroups, including B, F, M7, N*, and R.

These haplogroups account for 52.7% and 33.85% of those in the Northern Han, respectively. Haplogroup D is the modal mtDNA haplogroup among Northern East Asians. Among these haplogroups, D, B, F, and A were predominant in the Northern Han, with frequencies of 25.77%, 11.54%, 11.54%, and 8.08%, respectively.

However, in the Southern Han, the Northern and Southern East Asian-dominating mtDNA haplogroups accounted for 35.62% and 51.91%, respectively. The frequencies of haplogroups D, B, F, and A reached 15.68%, 20.85%, 16.29%, and 5.63%, respectively.

=== Tibetans ===
The origin of the Tibetans can be traced back to "Basal Asian" Xingyi inhabitants of the Tibetan Plateau, who lived there around 40,000–30,000 years ago, as well as to Neolithic farmers with Yellow River ancestry who migrated from Northern China within the last 10,000 years and introduced the Sino-Tibetan languages. Modern Tibetans derive approximately 80% of their ancestry from Yellow River farmers, with the remaining 20% from the "Basal Asian" Xingyi lineage. The present-day Tibetan gene pool was largely established by at least 5,100 years BP. Tibetan populations exhibit a high frequency of an EPAS1 haplotype acquired through introgression with Denisovans, which assists with adaptation to low oxygen levels at high elevation.

==== Paternal lineage ====
Tibetan males predominantly belong to the paternal lineage D-M174 followed by lower amounts of O-M175.

==== Maternal lineage ====
Tibetan females belong mainly to the Northern East Asian maternal haplogroups M9a1a, M9a1b, D4g2, D4i and G2ac, showing continuity with ancient middle and upper Yellow River populations.

=== Turkic peoples ===
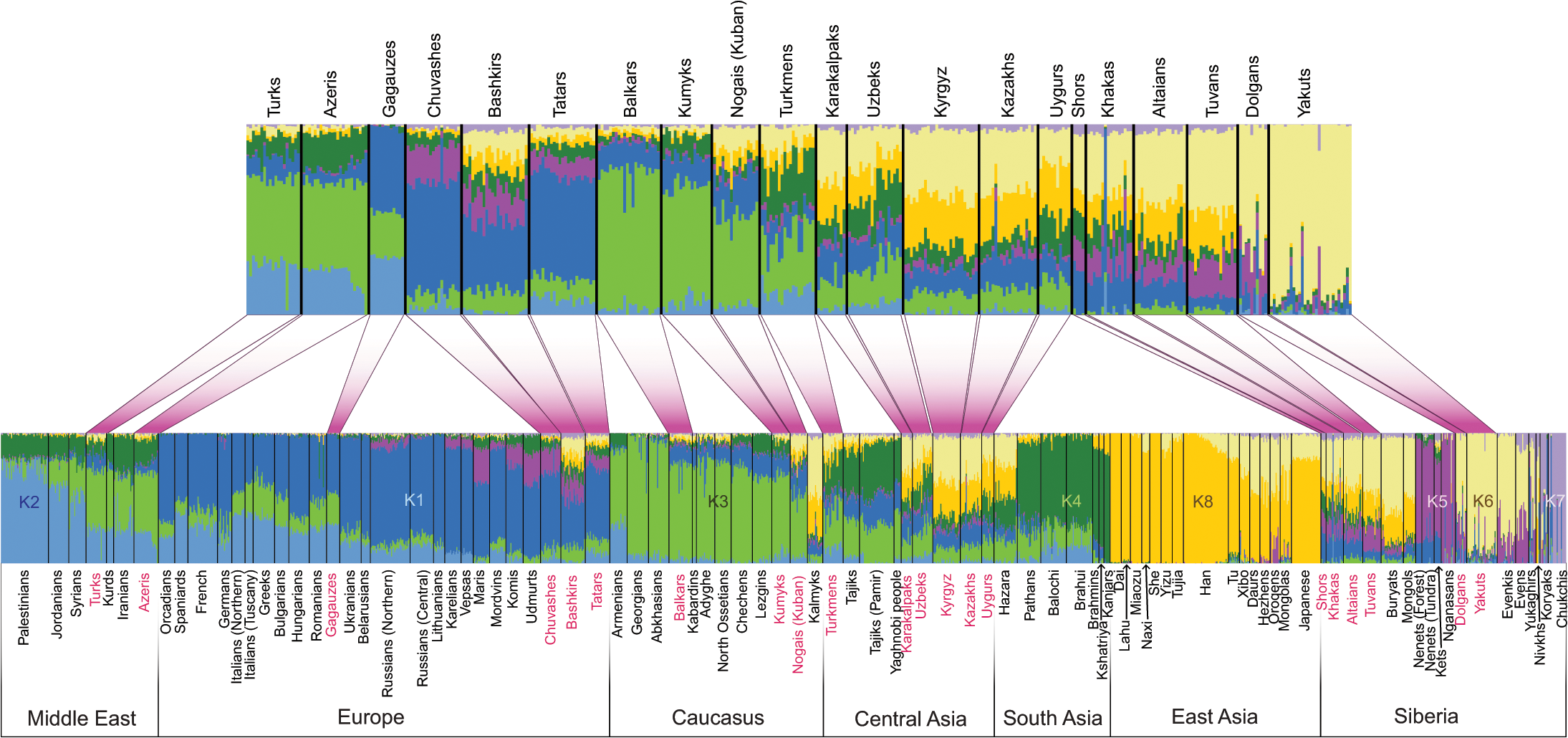
Population structure of Turkic-speaking populations in the context of their geographic neighbors across Eurasia. Turkic-speaking populations are shown in red. The upper barplot shows only Turkic-speaking populations.

Linguistic and genetic evidence strongly suggests an early presence of Turkic peoples in eastern Mongolia. The genetic evidence suggests that the Turkification of Central Asia was carried out by East Asian dominant minorities migrating out of Mongolia.

Genetic data found that almost all modern Turkic-speaking peoples retained at least some shared ancestry associated with "Southern Siberian and Mongolian" (SSM) populations, supporting this region as the "Inner Asian Homeland (IAH) of the pioneer carriers of Turkic languages" which subsequently expanded into Central Asia.

An Ancient Northeast Asian (ANA) origin of the early Turkic peoples has been corroborated in multiple recent studies. Early and medieval Turkic groups however exhibited a wide range of both (Northern) East Asian and West Eurasian genetic origins, in part through long-term contact with neighboring peoples such as Iranian, Mongolic, Tocharian, Uralic and Yeniseian peoples, and others.

==== Paternal lineages ====
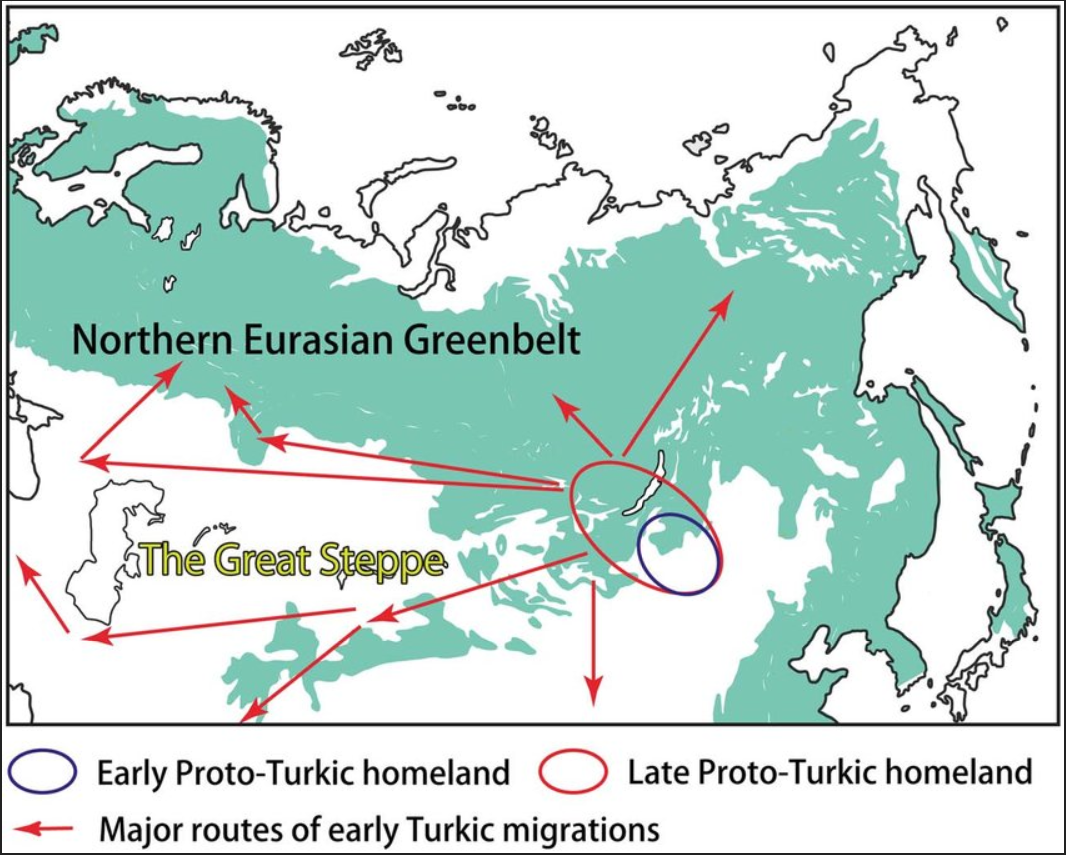
Genetic, archeologic and linguistic evidence links the early Turkic peoples with Northeast Asian millet-agriculturalists, which later adopted a nomadic lifestyle and expanded from eastern Mongolia westwards.

Common Y-DNA haplogroups in Turkic peoples are Haplogroup N-M231 (found with especially high frequency among Turkic peoples living in present-day Russia, especially among Siberian Tatars, as Zabolotnie Tatars have one of the highest frequencies of this haplogroup, second only to Samoyedic Nganasans ), Haplogroup C-M217 (especially in Central Asia, and in particular, Kazakhstan, also in Siberia among Siberian Tatars), Haplogroup Q-M242 (especially in Southern Siberia among the Siberian Tatars, also quite frequent among Lipka Tatars and among Turkmens and the Qangly tribe of Kazakhs), and Haplogroup O-M175 (especially among Turkic peoples living in present-day China, the Naiman tribe of Kazakhs and Siberian Tatars). Some groups also have Haplogroup R1b (notably frequent among the Teleuts, Siberian Tatars, and Kumandins of Southern Siberia, the Bashkirs of the Southern Ural region of Russia, and the Qypshaq tribe of Kazakhs), Haplogroup R1a (notably frequent among the Kyrgyz, Altaians, Siberian Tatars, Lipka Tatars, Volga Tatars, Crimean Tatars and several other Turkic peoples living in present-day Russia), Haplogroup J-M172 (especially frequent among Uyghurs, Azerbaijanis, and Turkish people), and Haplogroup D-M174 (especially among Yugurs, but also observed regularly with low frequency among Southern Altaians, Nogais, Kazakhs, and Uzbeks).

== Relationship to other Asia-Pacific and Native American populations ==
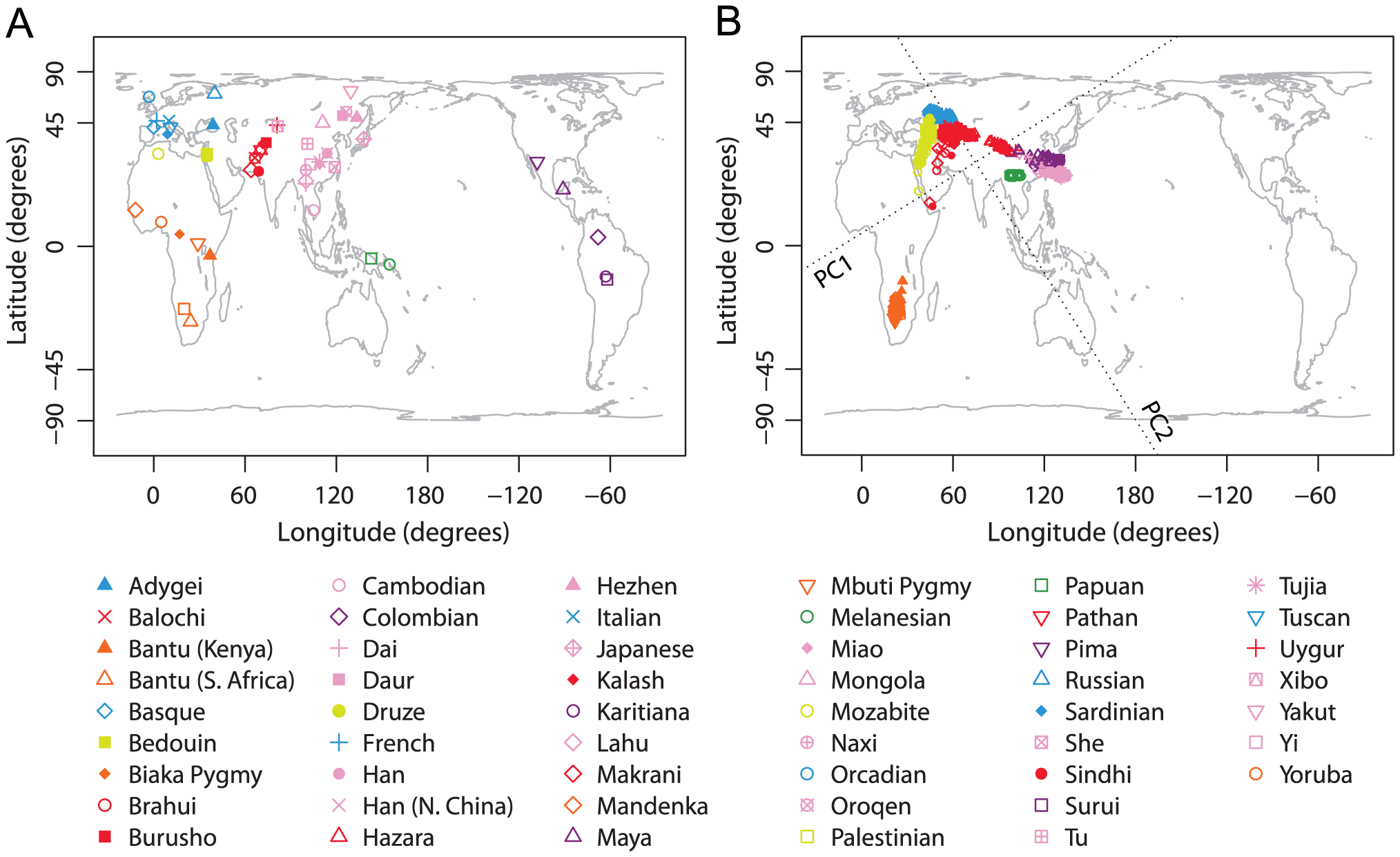
PCA plot of genetic variation of worldwide populations. Australasians (green) cluster relative close to other East Eurasians, such as East/Southeast Asians.

=== Australasians ===
Melanesians and Aboriginal Australians are deeply related to East Asians. Genetic studies have revealed that Australasians descended from the same Eastern Eurasian source population as East Asians and Ancient Ancestral South Asians (AASI). The 'Australasian', 'Ancient Ancestral South Indian', and 'East and Southeast Asian' lineages display a closer genetic relationship to each other than to any non-Asian lineages, as well as being closer to each other than to any of the early East Eurasian IUP lineages (Bacho Kiro etc.), and together represent the main branches of "Asian-related ancestry", which diverged from each other >40,000 years ago.

=== Central Asians ===
The oldest modern human genome found in Central Asia belongs to the deeply East Eurasian IUP-affiliated Ust'Ishim man. The population affiliated with this specimen is inferred to have not contributed to modern human populations. During the late Upper Paleolithic period, geneflow from Ancient North Eurasians (ANE) played a significant role in the genetic makeup of Central Asia. The ANE carried both Upper Paleolithic European and East/Southeast Asian ancestry. Post-Paleolithic geneflow included movements of Paleo-Siberian and Northeast Asian groups into Central Asia, admixing with local ANE-rich groups resulting in the formation of the Botai genetic grouping, with close affinities to West Siberian hunter-gatherers (WSHG). Subsequently, massive geneflow from Western Steppe Herders from eastern and central Europe is associated with the formation of the Andronovo culture and the spread of Indo-Iranian languages. Interactions between pre-existing groups with Andronovo and Paleo-Siberian tribes, resulted in the origin of early Scythians. During the Iron Age, the Turkification of Central Asia was carried out by East Asian dominant minorities migrating out of Mongolia. The Turkic-speaking Central Asian populations, such as Kyrgyz, Kazakhs, Uzbeks, and Turkmens share more of their gene pool with various East Asian and Siberian populations than with West Asian or European populations.

=== Native Americans ===
All Native American populations descend from an ancient Paleo-Siberian group which emerged by the merger of Ancient East Asians and Ancient North Eurasians. While the East Asian-like ancestry is best represented by Ancient Northern East Asians (ANEA; Amur14k), it may also include ancestry from further South prior to the divergence between Southern and Northern East Asians. Beyond that, there may be a small and variable amount of deeply branching East Asian admixture best represented by the Onge, Papuans or the Tianyuan man. This deep ghost component has been dubbed as "population Y".

=== South Asians ===
The genetic makeup of modern South Asians can be described as a combination of West Eurasian ancestries with divergent East Eurasian ancestries. The latter primarily include an indigenous South Asian component (termed Ancient Ancestral South Indians, short "AASI") that is distantly related to the Andamanese peoples, as well as to East Asians and Aboriginal Australians, and further include additional, regionally variable East/Southeast Asian components. The East Asian-related ancestry component forms the major ancestry among Tibeto-Burmese and Khasi-Aslian speakers in the Himalayan foothills and Northeast India, and is generally distributed throughout South Asia at lower frequency, with substantial presence in Mundari-speaking groups. Southern East Asian ancestry is primarily associated with the dispersal of Austroasiatic rice farmers, which migrated from Southeast Asia into India. Multiple researches indicate that the Austroasiatic populations in India are derived from (mostly male dominated) migrations from Southeast Asia during the Holocene. (Note: "ASI-AAA") According to Van Driem (2007), "...the mitochondrial picture indicates that the Munda maternal lineage derives from the earliest human settlers on the Subcontinent, whilst the predominant Y chromosome haplogroup argues for a Southeast Asian paternal homeland for Austroasiatic language communities in India."

Geneflow from Southeast Asians (particularly Austroasiatic groups) to South Asian peoples is associated with the introduction of rice-agriculture to South Asia. There is significant cultural, linguistic, and political Austroasiatic influence on early India, which can also be observed by the presence of Austroasiatic loanwords within Indo-Aryan languages.

=== Southeast Asians ===
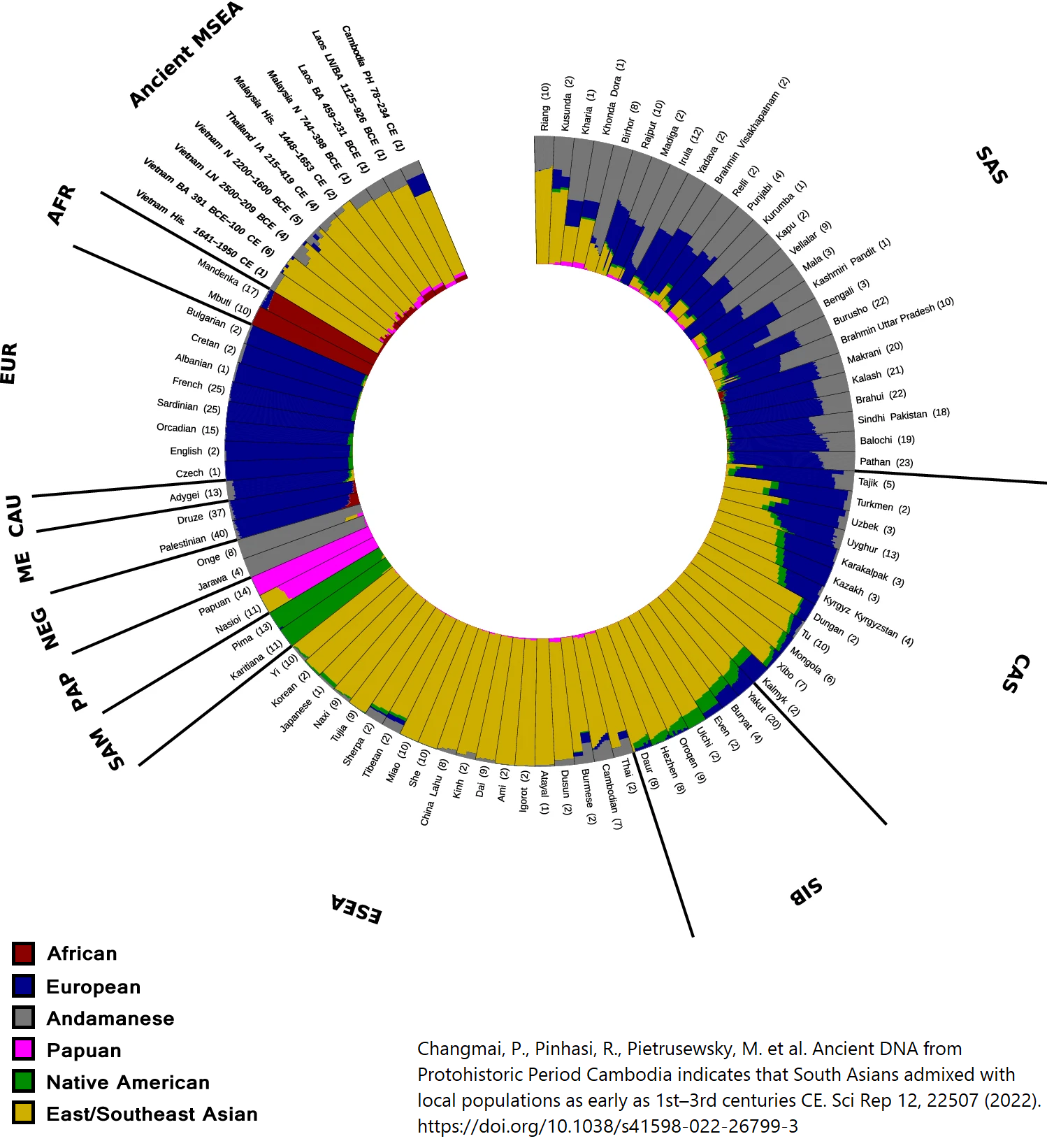
Estimated ancestry components among selected modern populations per Changmai et al. (2022). The yellow component represents East Asian-like ancestry.

Southeast Asians represent one of the most closely related groups to East Asians, with both being referred to as East/Southeast Asian. While East Asians primarily derive from both ANEA and ASEA components, Southeast Asians derive most of their ancestry from the ASEA component with variable amounts of deeper branching East Asian-like admixture (mostly Onge/Hoabinhian-like) and limited ANEA contributions. While Hoabinhian-like ancestry is associated with indigenous hunter-gatherers, ASEA ancestry spread mostly with Neolithic expansions associated with Austroasiatic and Austronesian groups.

Evidence for more complex Mesolithic migration patterns are evident in the remains of a hunter-gatherer specimen from Maritime Southeast Asia, South Sulawesi, which was found to have ancestry from two deeply diverged East Eurasian lineages. The remains had approximately c. 50% "Tianyuan/Onge" ancestry and c. 50% Papuan-like ancestry.

There is also evidence for low proportions (~5%) of South Asian-associated "SAS ancestry" (best exemplified by modern South Indian groups such as Irula or Mala) among specific Mainland Southeast Asian (MESA) ethnic groups (~2–16% as inferred by qpAdm), likely as a result of cultural diffusion; mainly through maritime trade and Indianized kingdoms of Southeast Asia. Overall, the geneflow event is estimated to have happened between 500 and 1000 YBP.

== See also ==
- Gediminids, high East Asian genetic component.
