= Abag =

Abag or ABAG may refer to:

- Abag Banner, subdivision of Inner Mongolia, China
- Avrom Ber Gotlober (1811–1899), Ukrainian-Polish Hebrew- and Yiddish-language playwright, poet and scholar
- Association of Bay Area Governments, regional planning agency incorporating local governments in California's San Francisco Bay Area
