= Abaganar =

Branch of the Mongols in Inner Mongolia, and Mongolia

Regions with significant populations

Religion
- Tibetan Buddhism, Mongolian shamanism, Atheism

Related ethnic groups
- Mongols, especially Southern Mongols

The Abaganars (Mongolian: ᠠᠪᠠᠭᠠᠨᠠᠷ; Авганар; simplified Chinese: 阿巴哈纳尔部; traditional Chinese: 阿巴哈納爾部) are a Mongol sub-ethnic group in Abag Banner, Inner Mongolia of China, and Sükhbaatar Province of Mongolia.

== Etymology ==
The ethnonyms "Abaganar" and "Abaga" translated from Mongolian language means paternal uncle. According to G. Sukhbaatar, these ethnonyms goes deep into history, right up to the Xianbei. L. Bazin was the first to propose such an interpretation, comparing the Xianbei aimak Afugan with Abagas.

== History ==
The Abaganars and Abagas appeared in the 13th century from the people granted by Genghis Khan to his brother Belgutei. Some of them mixed not only with Mongol-speaking tribes - Oirats, Khalkhas, Buryats, Inner Mongols and Kalmyks, but also became part of the Turkmens, Telengits and Evenks.

== See also ==
- Administrative divisions of Northern Yuan Dynasty
- Demographics of China
- List of medieval Mongolian tribes and clans
- List of Mongolian monarchs
- Mongols in China
- Northern Mongolia
- Western Mongolia
