= Abaga Mongols =

Mongolian ethnic group

Abaga
Regions with significant populations

Religion
- Tibetan Buddhism, Mongolian Shamanism

Related ethnic groups
- Mongols, Southern Mongols

The Abagas (Mongolian: ᠠᠪᠠᠭ᠎ᠠ; Авга; Chinese: 阿巴噶部) are a subgroup of Mongols mainly living in Abag Banner, Inner Mongolia.

== Etymology ==
The ethnonym "Abaga" translated from Mongolian language means paternal uncle. According to G. Sukhbaatar, this ethnonym goes deep into history, right up to the Xianbei. L. Bazin was the first to propose such an interpretation, comparing the Xianbei aimak Afugan with Abagas.

== History ==
The Abagas and Abaganars appeared in the 13th century from the people granted by Genghis Khan to his brother Belgutei. Some of them mixed not only with Mongol-speaking tribes - Oirats, Khalkhas, Buryats, Inner Mongols and Kalmyks, but also became part of the Turkmens, Telengits and Evenks.

== See also ==
- Demographics of China
- List of modern Mongolian clans
