= Abag Banner =

Abag Banner 阿巴嘎旗 • ᠠᠪᠠᠭ᠎ᠠ ᠬᠣᠰᠢᠭᠤ
- Banner
- Location in Inner Mongolia Abag (China)
- Coordinates: 43°33′23″N 115°20′42″E
- Country: China
- Autonomous region: Inner Mongolia
- League: Xilin Gol
- Banner seat: Biligtai

Area
  - Total: 27,490 km^{2} (10,610 sq mi)

Population (2020)
  - Total: 38,589
  - Density: 1.404/km^{2} (3.636/sq mi)
- Time zone: UTC+8 (China Standard)
- Website: www.abg.gov.cn

Abag Banner

Chinese name
- Chinese: 阿巴嘎旗
Transcriptions
Standard Mandarin
- Hanyu Pinyin: Ābāgā Qí

Mongolian name
- Mongolian Cyrillic: Авга хошуу
- Mongolian script: ᠠᠪᠠᠭ᠎ᠠ ᠬᠣᠰᠢᠭᠤ
Transcriptions
- SASM/GNC: Abaɣ-a qosiɣu

Abag Banner (Mongolian: ᠠᠪᠠᠭ᠎ᠠ ᠬᠣᠰᠢᠭᠤ; Chinese: 阿巴嘎旗) is a county of Inner Mongolia, China. It is under the administration of Xilingol League. Abaga and Abaganar Mongols live here. The local dialect has variously been classified as Chakhar or Khalkha.

== Demographics ==
The proportion of nationalities in Abag Banner (2020)
Nationality	Percentage
Mongols	54.6%
Han	43.9%
Manchus	0.9%
Hui People	0.3%
Daur	0.1%
Miao (Hmong)	0.1%
Others	0.1%
Source of the population statistics :

== Administrative divisions ==
Abag Banner is divided into 3 towns and 4 sums.

Name	Simplified Chinese	Hanyu Pinyin	Mongolian (Hudum Script)	Mongolian (Cyrillic)	Administrative division code
Towns
Biligtai Town	别力古台镇	Biélìgǔtái Zhèn	ᠪᠡᠯᠭᠦᠳᠡᠢ ᠪᠠᠯᠭᠠᠰᠤ	Бэлгүтэй балгас	152522100
Honggor Gol Town	洪格尔高勒镇	Hónggé'ěrgāolè Zhèn	ᠬᠣᠩᠭᠣᠷᠭᠣᠣᠯ ᠪᠠᠯᠭᠠᠰᠤ	Хонгоргол балгас	152522101
Qagan Nur Town	查干淖尔镇	Chágànnào'ěr Zhèn	ᠴᠠᠭᠠᠨᠨᠠᠭᠤᠷ ᠪᠠᠯᠭᠠᠰᠤ	Цагааннуур балгас	152522102
Sums
Naran Bulag Sum	那仁宝拉格苏木	Nàrénbǎolāgé Sūmù	ᠨᠠᠷᠠᠨᠪᠤᠯᠠᠭ ᠰᠤᠮᠤ	Наранбулаг сум	152522200
Ih Gol Sum	伊和高勒苏木	Yīhégāolè Sūmù	ᠶᠡᠬᠡᠭᠣᠣᠯ ᠰᠤᠮᠤ	Ихгол сум	152522201
Jargalangt Sum	吉尔嘎郎图苏木	Jí'ěrgālángtú Sūmù	ᠵᠢᠷᠭᠠᠯᠠᠩᠲᠤ ᠰᠤᠮᠤ	Жаргалант сум	152522202
Bayan Tug Sum	巴彦图嘎苏木	Bāyàntúgā Sūmù	ᠪᠠᠶᠠᠨᠲᠤᠭ ᠰᠤᠮᠤ	Баянтуг сум	152522203

Other: Manit Coal Mine (玛尼图煤矿)(ᠮᠠᠨᠢᠲᠤ ᠨᠡᠭᠦᠷᠡᠰᠦᠨ ᠠᠭᠤᠷᠬᠠᠢ)

== Climate ==
Abag Banner has a monsoon-influenced, continental semi-arid climate (Köppen BSk), with very cold and dry winters, very warm, somewhat humid summers, and strong winds, especially in spring. The monthly 24-hour average temperature ranges from −20.9 °C (−5.6 °F) in January to 21.3 °C (70.3 °F) in July, with the annual mean at 1.93 °C (35.5 °F). The annual precipitation is 238 mm (9.4 in), with more than half of it falling in July and August alone. There are 3,017 hours of bright sunshine annually, with each of the winter months having over two-thirds of the possible total, and this percentage falling to 60 in July.

Climate data for Abag Banner, elevation 1,148 m (3,766 ft), (1991–2020 normals, extremes 1952–present)
Month	Jan	Feb	Mar	Apr	May	Jun	Jul	Aug	Sep	Oct	Nov	Dec	Year
Record high °C (°F)	7.8 (46.0)	12.6 (54.7)	21.5 (70.7)	31.0 (87.8)	34.4 (93.9)	36.9 (98.4)	39.7 (103.5)	36.8 (98.2)	35.1 (95.2)	28.0 (82.4)	17.7 (63.9)	7.3 (45.1)	39.7 (103.5)
Mean daily maximum °C (°F)	−13.6 (7.5)	−7.5 (18.5)	2.4 (36.3)	12.8 (55.0)	20.4 (68.7)	25.5 (77.9)	28.1 (82.6)	26.5 (79.7)	20.6 (69.1)	10.8 (51.4)	−1.1 (30.0)	−11.4 (11.5)	9.5 (49.0)
Daily mean °C (°F)	−20.2 (−4.4)	−15.1 (4.8)	−5.0 (23.0)	5.3 (41.5)	13.2 (55.8)	19.0 (66.2)	21.9 (71.4)	19.9 (67.8)	13.3 (55.9)	3.3 (37.9)	−8.0 (17.6)	−17.5 (0.5)	2.5 (36.5)
Mean daily minimum °C (°F)	−25.4 (−13.7)	−21.1 (−6.0)	−11.3 (11.7)	−1.7 (28.9)	5.8 (42.4)	12.3 (54.1)	15.8 (60.4)	13.7 (56.7)	6.7 (44.1)	−2.7 (27.1)	−13.2 (8.2)	−22.4 (−8.3)	−3.6 (25.5)
Record low °C (°F)	−42.2 (−44.0)	−41.5 (−42.7)	−28.6 (−19.5)	−20.8 (−5.4)	−11.7 (10.9)	−1.4 (29.5)	5.0 (41.0)	−1.9 (28.6)	−8.7 (16.3)	−22.2 (−8.0)	−34.6 (−30.3)	−41.4 (−42.5)	−42.2 (−44.0)
Average precipitation mm (inches)	1.4 (0.06)	1.7 (0.07)	4.2 (0.17)	9.2 (0.36)	22.3 (0.88)	43.8 (1.72)	66.1 (2.60)	50.7 (2.00)	20.8 (0.82)	12.1 (0.48)	4.8 (0.19)	3.0 (0.12)	240.1 (9.47)
Average precipitation days (≥ 0.1 mm)	3.5	2.9	3.8	4.1	6.5	10.2	11.1	8.8	6.6	4.6	5.0	4.8	71.9
Average snowy days	9.2	7.0	6.9	4.3	1.1	0	0	0	0.4	4.0	8.4	10.1	51.4
Average relative humidity (%)	72	66	52	37	37	47	55	55	50	52	62	71	55
Mean monthly sunshine hours	200.1	218.2	267.6	270.7	293.1	281.3	281.2	284.5	262.6	236.0	197.4	183.0	2,975.7
Percentage possible sunshine	69	73	72	67	64	61	61	67	71	70	69	66	68
Source: China Meteorological Administration all-time extreme temperatureextremes

Climate data for Naran Bulag Sum (Narenbaolage Sumu), Abag Banner, elevation 1,182 m (3,878 ft), (1991–2020 normals)
Month	Jan	Feb	Mar	Apr	May	Jun	Jul	Aug	Sep	Oct	Nov	Dec	Year
Mean daily maximum °C (°F)	−14.2 (6.4)	−8.5 (16.7)	1.2 (34.2)	11.9 (53.4)	19.8 (67.6)	25.0 (77.0)	27.6 (81.7)	25.9 (78.6)	19.8 (67.6)	9.8 (49.6)	−2.4 (27.7)	−12.4 (9.7)	8.6 (47.5)
Daily mean °C (°F)	−20.6 (−5.1)	−15.8 (3.6)	−6.1 (21.0)	4.4 (39.9)	12.4 (54.3)	18.4 (65.1)	21.2 (70.2)	19.2 (66.6)	12.3 (54.1)	2.3 (36.1)	−9.4 (15.1)	−18.4 (−1.1)	1.7 (35.0)
Mean daily minimum °C (°F)	−26.0 (−14.8)	−21.8 (−7.2)	−12.5 (9.5)	−2.8 (27.0)	4.7 (40.5)	11.5 (52.7)	14.8 (58.6)	12.7 (54.9)	5.5 (41.9)	−3.9 (25.0)	−14.9 (5.2)	−23.6 (−10.5)	−4.7 (23.6)
Average precipitation mm (inches)	1.3 (0.05)	2.0 (0.08)	3.3 (0.13)	7.5 (0.30)	19.6 (0.77)	41.6 (1.64)	57.7 (2.27)	49.9 (1.96)	20.7 (0.81)	9.4 (0.37)	4.3 (0.17)	2.6 (0.10)	219.9 (8.65)
Average precipitation days (≥ 0.1 mm)	2.8	2.5	3.2	3.6	6.1	10.4	10.9	8.6	6.1	4.1	4.3	3.9	66.5
Average snowy days	6.2	4.6	5.1	3.6	1.1	0	0	0	0.4	3.5	6.9	7.1	38.5
Average relative humidity (%)	72	67	54	38	38	48	55	55	51	53	65	72	56
Mean monthly sunshine hours	209.0	221.8	270.6	277.8	290.4	275.8	280.6	280.7	261.3	240.2	202.3	191.2	3,001.7
Percentage possible sunshine	73	74	73	68	63	59	60	65	71	72	71	70	68
Source: China Meteorological Administration

== Bibliography ==
- www.xzqh.org (in Chinese)
- (in Mongolian) Sečenbaγatur, Qasgerel, Tuyaγ-a, B. ǰirannige, U Ying ǰe. 2005. Mongγul kelen-ü nutuγ-un ayalγun-u sinǰilel-ün uduridqal. Kökeqota: ÖMAKQ. ISBN 7-204-07621-4.
- Svantesson, Jan-Olof, Anna Tsendina, Anastasia Karlsson, Vivan Franzén. 2005. The Phonology of Mongolian. New York: Oxford University Press. ISBN 0-19-926017-6.
