= Turkic Christians =

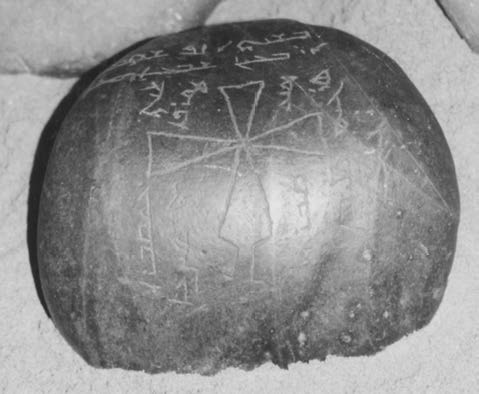
- Gravestone from Kyrgyzstan (thirteenth/fourteenth century) with Syriac Christian inscriptions

Total population
- Over 1.8 million

Regions with significant populations
- Russia: c. 1,500,000
- Moldova: c. 126,000
- Kazakhstan: c. 40,300
- Ukraine: c. 32,000
- Iraq: c. 30,000
- Kyrgyzstan: c. 25,000–50,000
- Uzbekistan: c. 10,000
- Bulgaria: c. 5,425
- Azerbaijan: c. 5,000
- Turkey: c. 4,500–35,000

Languages
- Turkic languages

Religion
- Predominantly Eastern Orthodoxy; Minority Protestantism, Catholicism

Turkic Christians are ethnic Turkic people who follow Christianity. The Christian Turkic peoples represent an intersection of Turkic and Christian cultural and historical dynamics, particularly within the context of Central Asia, Balkans, and the Caucasus. Historically, the most prominent group within this category were the Bulgars. Currently, the Christian Turkic peoples include the Chuvash of Chuvashia, the Gagauz (Gökoğuz) of Moldova, Yakuts of the Sakha Republic, and two Tatar subgroups (Kryashens and Nağaybäks) of the Volga-Ural region. The vast majority of people from those ethnic groups are Eastern Orthodox Christians.

The Bulgars were Turkic semi-nomadic warrior tribes that flourished in the Pontic–Caspian steppe and the Volga region between the 5th and 7th centuries. They became known as nomadic equestrians in the Volga-Ural region, but some researchers believe that their ethnic roots can be traced to Central Asia. The Bulgars converted to Christianity during the early medieval period, around the 10th century. Under Khan Boris I (r. 852–889), they officially adopted Christianity in 865 and embraced Eastern Orthodoxy in 879. Their Christian identity was shaped by a blend of Byzantine and local Eastern Christian traditions, which significantly influenced their cultural and political relations with neighboring states.

Between the 9th and 14th centuries, the Church of the East, often referred to as the Nestorian Church, had a notable presence among Turkic peoples, including the Naimans, a prominent Turkic tribe. Between the 9th and 14th centuries, it represented the world's largest Christian denomination in terms of geographical extent, and in the Middle Ages was one of the three major Christian powerhouses of Eurasia alongside Latin Catholicism and Greek Orthodoxy. It established dioceses and communities stretching from the Mediterranean Sea and today's Iraq and Iran, to India (the Saint Thomas Syrian Christians of Kerala), the Mongol kingdoms and Turkic tribes in Central Asia, and China during the Tang dynasty (7th–9th centuries). This period marked a significant expansion of the Church's influence into Central Asia and beyond. It even revived in Gaochang and expanded in Xinjiang in the Yuan dynasty period. The rise of Islam in the region and the decline of Mongol power contributed to the persecution and eventual disappearance of the Church of the East from Central Asia.

In the 19th century, numerous Turkic groups within the Russian Empire, such as the Nağaybäk, Chuvash of Chuvashia, and Yakuts of the Sakha Republic, increasingly adopted Russian ways of life. Many of these communities converted en masse to Russian Orthodox Christianity, reflecting the broader cultural and religious influences of the empire during this period. Most Nağaybäks are Christian and were largely converted during the 18th century.

== History ==
=== Middle Ages ===
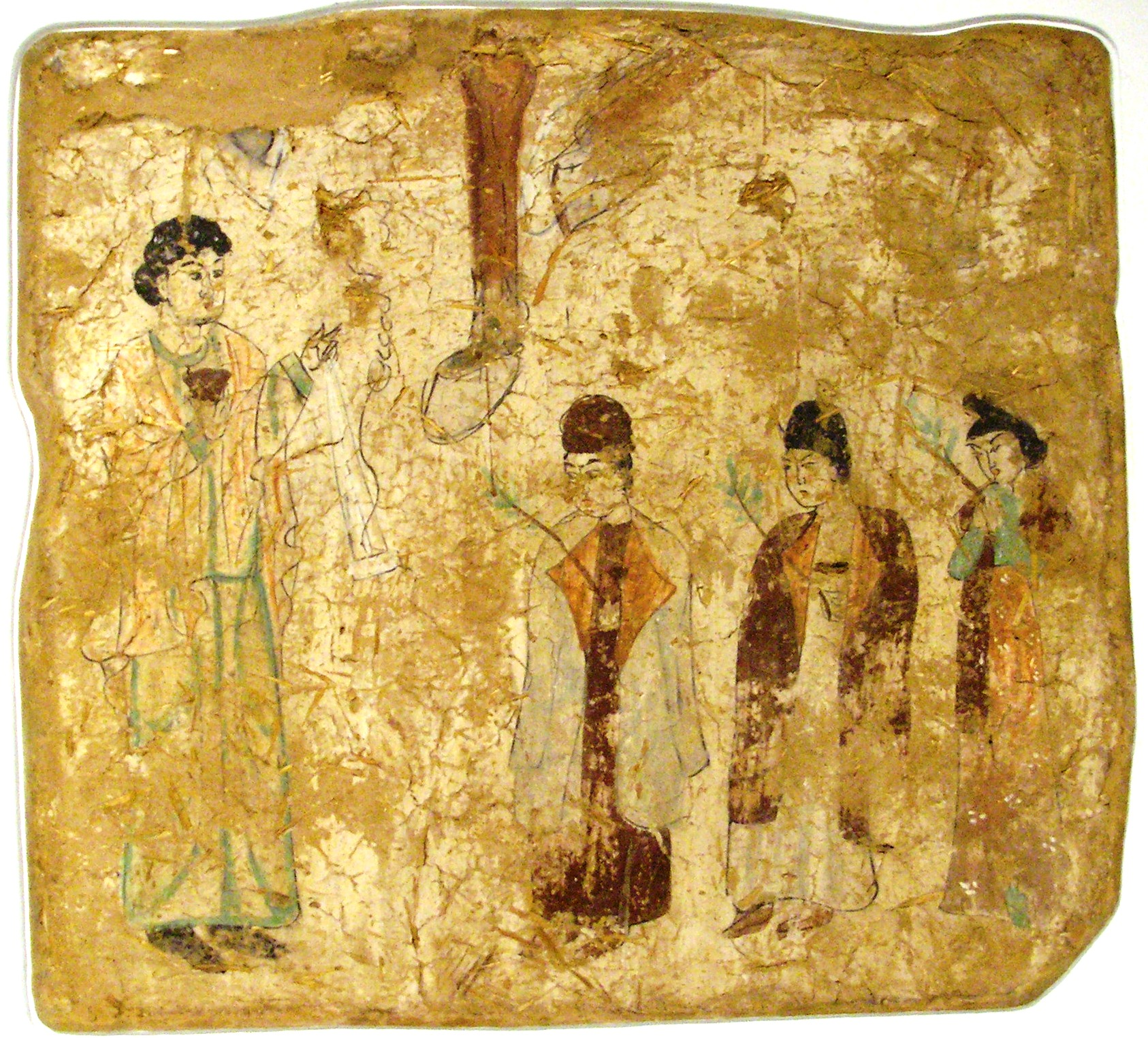
Palm Sunday procession of Nestorian clergy in a 7th- or 8th-century wall painting from a church at Karakhoja, Chinese Turkestan

The Bulgars, a Turkic semi-nomadic semi-nomadic warrior tribe thrived in the expansive landscapes of the Pontic-Caspian steppe and the Volga region from the 5th to the 7th centuries. Originating from Central Asia, the Bulgars became renowned as skilled equestrians and fierce warriors, adapting to the demands of their environment while establishing a formidable presence in the region. By the 10th century, they began to embrace Christianity, a pivotal transformation that would shape their identity and influence in the broader Eurasian context. The Bulgars’ conversion to Christianity was formalized during the reign of Khan Boris I, who ruled from 852 to 889. Under his leadership, the Bulgars officially adopted Christianity in 865, subsequently embracing Eastern Orthodoxy in 879. This shift was not merely a religious change but a complex interplay of cultural exchanges with the Byzantine Empire and local Eastern Christian traditions. As a result, their Christian identity emerged from a rich tapestry of influences, which significantly impacted their political and cultural relationships with neighboring states and peoples.

The Uyghur Khaganate had established itself by the year 744 AD. Through trade relations established with China, its capital city of Ordu Baliq in central Mongolia's Orkhon Valley became a wealthy center of commerce, and a significant portion of the Uyghur population abandoned their nomadic lifestyle for a sedentary one. The Uyghur Khaganate produced extensive literature, and a relatively high number of its inhabitants were literate. The official state religion of the early Uyghur Khaganate was Manichaeism, which was introduced through the conversion of Bögü Qaghan by the Sogdians after the An Lushan rebellion. The Uyghur Khaganate was tolerant of religious diversity and practiced variety of religions including Buddhism, Christianity, shamanism and Manichaeism.

The term "Gagauz" collectively refers to Turkic people in the Balkans who speak the Gagauz language, distinct from Balkan Gagauz Turkish. Two main theories exist regarding their origins. The first suggests that the Gagauz are descendants of the Pechenegs and Kumans, who migrated south into Bulgaria and intermingled with Oghuz Turks, which may explain their Christian faith. However, the Gagauz language shows no signs of Kipchak influence, being classified solely as a Western Oghuz Turkish dialect. The second theory posits a purely Oghuz origin, suggesting that Seljuk Turks from Anatolia migrated to the Byzantine Empire in the 13th century, converted to Christianity, and were settled in Dobruja, now part of Bulgaria and Romania.

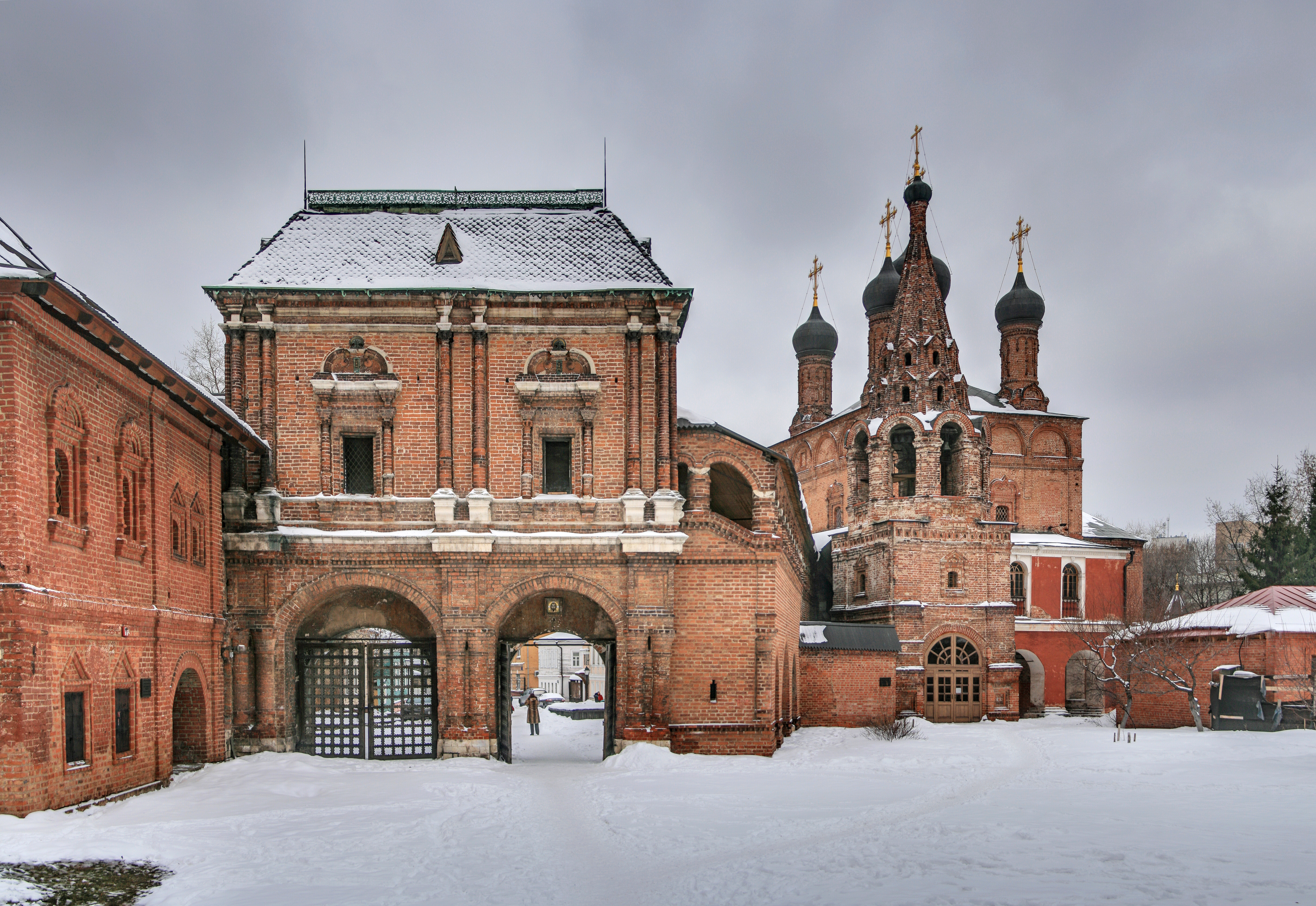
The Diocese of the Russian Church (Krutitsy) historically served as the seat of Sarai

The Cumans were a Turkic nomadic people from Central Asia, part of the western branch of the Cuman–Kipchak confederation. In 1227, they were baptized en masse in Moldavia by Robert, Archbishop of Esztergom, following the orders of Bortz Khan, who pledged allegiance to King Andrew II of Hungary. As a result, many Cumans in the region began to embrace Catholicism. In 1228, the Roman Catholic Diocese of Cumania was established as a Latin-rite bishopric west of the Siret River, in present-day Romania, and it existed until 1241. This area had been under Cuman control since around 1100. Catholic missions in the region began after King Andrew II granted Burzenland to the Teutonic Knights in 1211. Although Andrew expelled the Knights from the territory in 1225, Dominican friars continued the mission to convert the Cumans. Two years later, Robert baptized Boricius, a prominent Cuman chieftain, further solidifying the Cumans’ conversion to Catholicism. The term Cumania had come to mean any Catholic subordinated to the Milcovul Diocese, so much so that in some cases, the terms Cuman and Wallach (more precisely, Catholic Wallach, as the Orthodox Christians were considered schismatic, and the Pope did not officially recognise them) were interchangeable.

==== The Church of the East ====
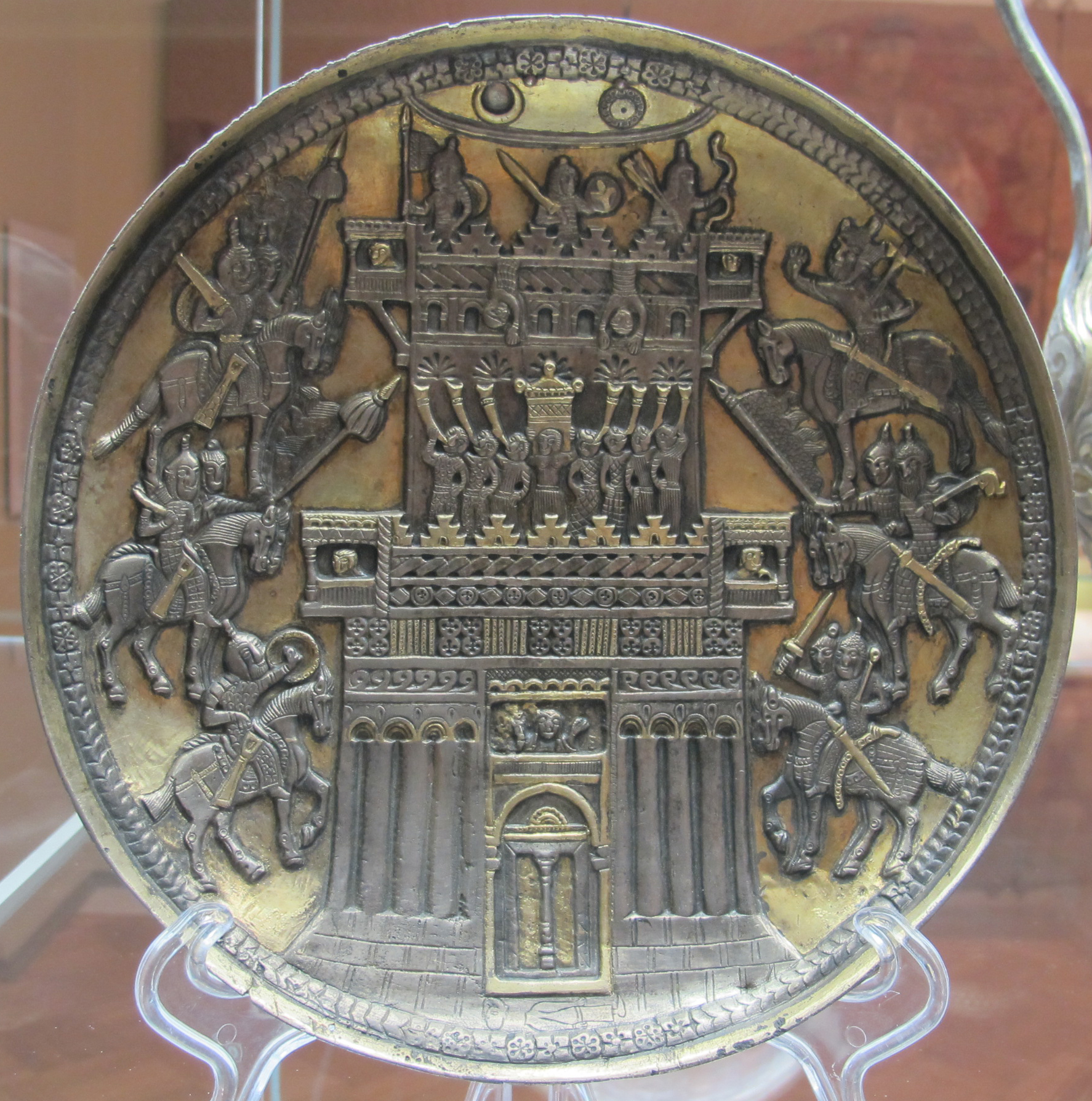
The Anikova dish: a Nestorian Christian plate with decoration of a besieged Jericho, by Sogdian artists under Karluk dominion, Semirechye

The Church of the East played a major role in the history of Christianity in Asia, between the 9th and 14th centuries, it represented the world's largest Christian denomination in terms of geographical extent, and in the Middle Ages was one of the three major Christian powerhouses of Eurasia alongside Latin Catholicism and Greek Orthodoxy. It established dioceses and communities stretching from the Mediterranean Sea and today's Iraq and Iran, to India (the Saint Thomas Syrian Christians of Kerala), the Mongol kingdoms and Turkic tribes in Central Asia, and China during the Tang dynasty (7th–9th centuries). In the 13th and 14th centuries, the church experienced a final period of expansion under the Mongol Empire, where influential Church of the East clergy sat in the Mongol court.

Many Mongol and Turkic tribes, such as the Keraites, the Naimans, the Merkit, the Ongud, and to a large extent the Qara Khitai (who practiced it side-by-side with Buddhism), were Nestorian Christian. The Keraites had converted to the Church of the East (Nestorianism) in the early 11th century and are one of the possible sources of the European Prester John legend. The Naimans that adopted Nestorianism probably converted around the same time the Keraites adopted the religion in the 11th century.

The Karluks were a prominent nomadic Turkic tribal confederacy residing in the regions of Kara-Irtysh (Black Irtysh) and the Tarbagatai Mountains west of the Altay Mountains in Central Asia. The Karluks converted to Nestorian Christianity at the end of the 8th century CE, about 15 years after they established themselves in the Jetisu region. This was the first time the Church of the East received such major sponsorship by an eastern power. Particularly, the Chigils were Christians of the Nestorian denomination.

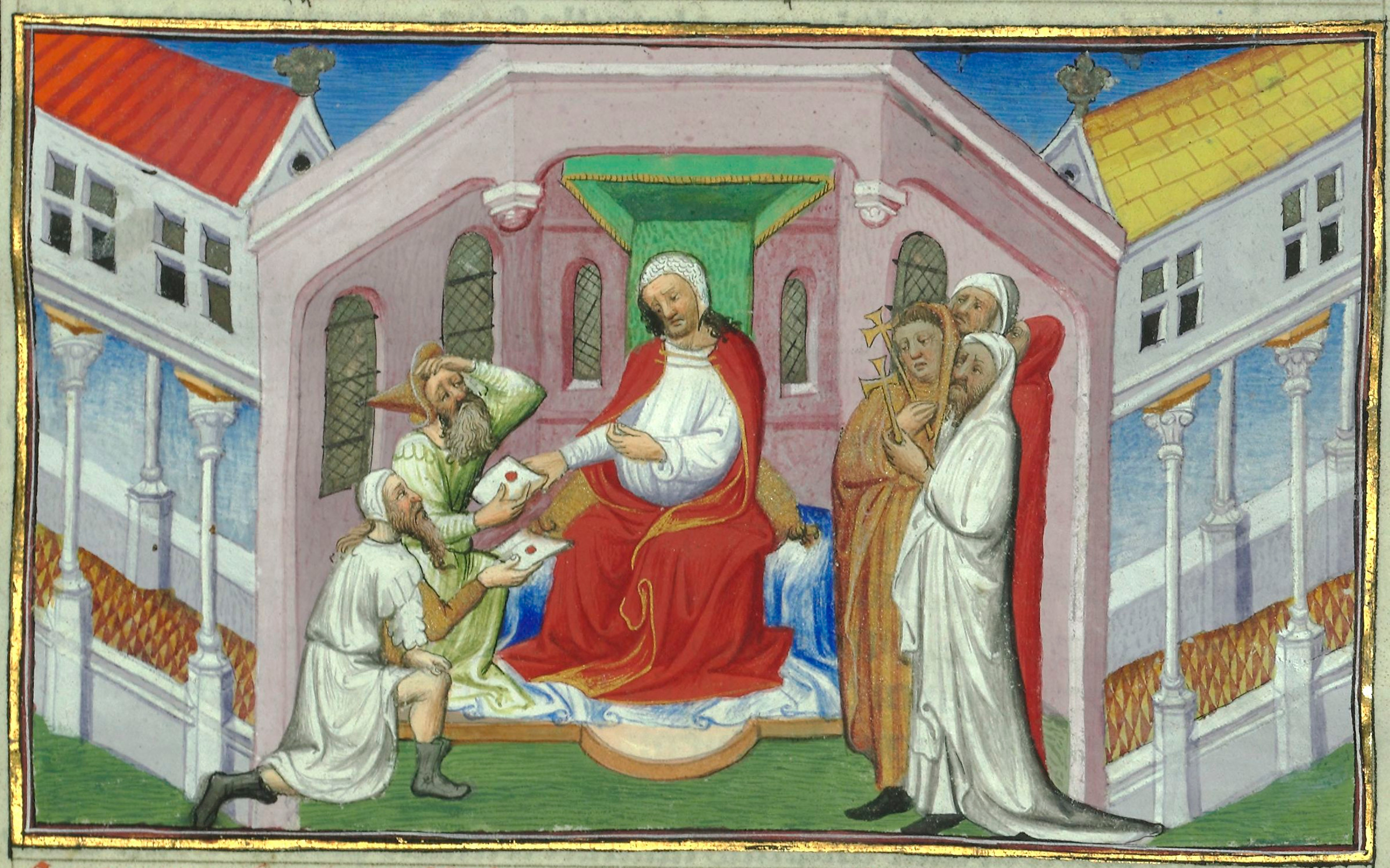
Depiction of Toghrul Khan as "Prester John" in Le Livre des Merveilles, 15th century

The practice of milk-drinking during these fasts was first sanctioned by the Nestorian Church in the 11th century in order to accommodate the conversion of some 200,000 Turkic Christians, who lived on meat and milk, to Nestorian Christianity. The first account suggests that Markus Buyruk Khan, formerly known as Sadiq Khan, converted to Nestorian Christianity in 1007 CE, along with about 200,000 of his Turco-Mongolic nomadic tribespeople. The Keraite were one of the five dominant tribes in the Tatar confederation before Genghis Khan united these tribes into the Mongol Empire. They lived in the Orkhon Steppes, located south of Lake Baikal and north of the Gobi Desert, in what is now known as the Altai-Sayan region. Following their conversion, the Nestorian Metropolitan consulted Patriarch John VI (also known as Prester John) about fasting practices for the new converts. It was decreed that they should abstain from meat and replace fermented horse milk with fresh milk. This adaptation preserved key aspects of their nomadic diet while integrating Christian practices.

Prominent Nestorian Turkic Christian figures include Yahballaha III, who served as Patriarch of the East from 1281 to 1317. Rabban Bar Sauma, a Uyghur or Ongud monk, became a diplomat for the Nestorian Church of the East in China. Additionally, Toghrul was a khan of the Keraites, a notable Turkic group. Other figures of include Aïbeg and Serkis and Sergius of Samarkand.

However, the rise of Islam and the subsequent decline of Mongol power led to increasing persecution of the Nestorian Christians. By the late medieval period, these dynamics contributed to the gradual disappearance of the Church of the East from Central Asia, erasing a once-vibrant Christian presence in the region. Tamerlane virtually exterminated the Church of the East, which had previously been a major branch of Christianity but afterwards became largely confined to a small area now known as the Assyrian Triangle, currently divided between present-day Iraq, Turkey, Iran and Syria.

=== Modern History ===
==== In the Ottoman Empire ====
During the Ottoman Empire, Turkish-speaking Christians were often overlooked, as their population was less than that of Armenians and Greeks, and all Christians were grouped together as a single millet. Throughout the Turkish War of Independence, many Turkish-speaking were actively loyal to the Turkish National Movement. Many Turkish-speaking Christians also strongly refused the Greek identity and language, emphasising that they were Turkish and not Greek. There were increasingly high demands for the establishment of an Eastern Orthodox Patriarchate for Turks. Later, Eftim I left the Greek Orthodox Church and established the Autocephalous Turkish Orthodox Patriarchate, as an autocephalous patriarchate of the Eastern Orthodox Church. The Turkish Patriarchate staunchly supported the Turkish National Movement, and Eftim I was a close friend of Mustafa Kemal Atatürk. On 1 June 1923, followers of Eftim I raided the Ecumenical Patriarchate of Constantinople, and assaulted the pro-Greek Meletius IV, Ecumenical Patriarch of Constantinople, causing French military police to intervene. Meletius IV was left badly injured. Eftim I praised the attack when addressing the public, and called for the resignation of Meletius IV, who he referred to as an "enemy of the Turkish people". On October 2, 1923, Eftim I and his followers, accompanied by some Turkish policemen, forcefully entered the Holy Synod when it was in session, and ordered the bishops to declare Meletius IV deposed. Out of the eight bishops, six voted in favor of Eftim I while two voted in favor of Meletius IV. After achieving the desired result, Eftim I announced that he would remain at the Ecumenial Patriarchate of Constantinople until seven new members, nominated by him, would be admitted to the Holy Synod, and that a someone who was loyal to Turkey would be elected as Ecumenical Patriarch of Constantinople. His demands were met, except for the election of a new patriarch, and Eftim I returned to Ankara as the “official representative” of all Orthodox Christians. Meletius IV signed his abdication on 20 September 1923, although he did not announce it due to his conflict with Eftim I. The Greek and Turkish governments both pressured Meletius IV to abdicate, and the Holy Synod received orders from the Turkish government to prepare for a new election, and to understand and accept that the next Ecumenical Patriarch of Constantinople was going to be a Turkish subject elected by Turkish subjects. On December 6, 1923, Gregorios VII, was elected Ecumenical Patriarch. Eftim I, who was banned from attending the election, opposed Gregorios VII. On the day after the election, Eftim I and his followers raided the Holy Synod and expelled all of its occupants, declaring that in his position as “general procurator”, he would continue the occupation until a new election for a legitimate Patriarch took place. In an open letter to Gregorios VII, he said "you know that you do not have the confidence of the Government. By accepting the office of Patriarch you have harmed the interests of the community. I advise you to resign." Two days later, the Turkish police returned the building to the Patriarchate. The Minister of Justice stated in the TBMM that the Patriarchate was solely a religious institution and that the Turkish government approved of the election of Gregorios VII. On December 25, Mustafa Kemal Atatürk thanked Gregorios VII for his loyal expressions towards the Republic of Turkey. In June 1925, Turkey and Greece officially resolved the conflict over the Ecumenical Patriarchate, and Basil III was elected.

==== In the Russian Empire ====
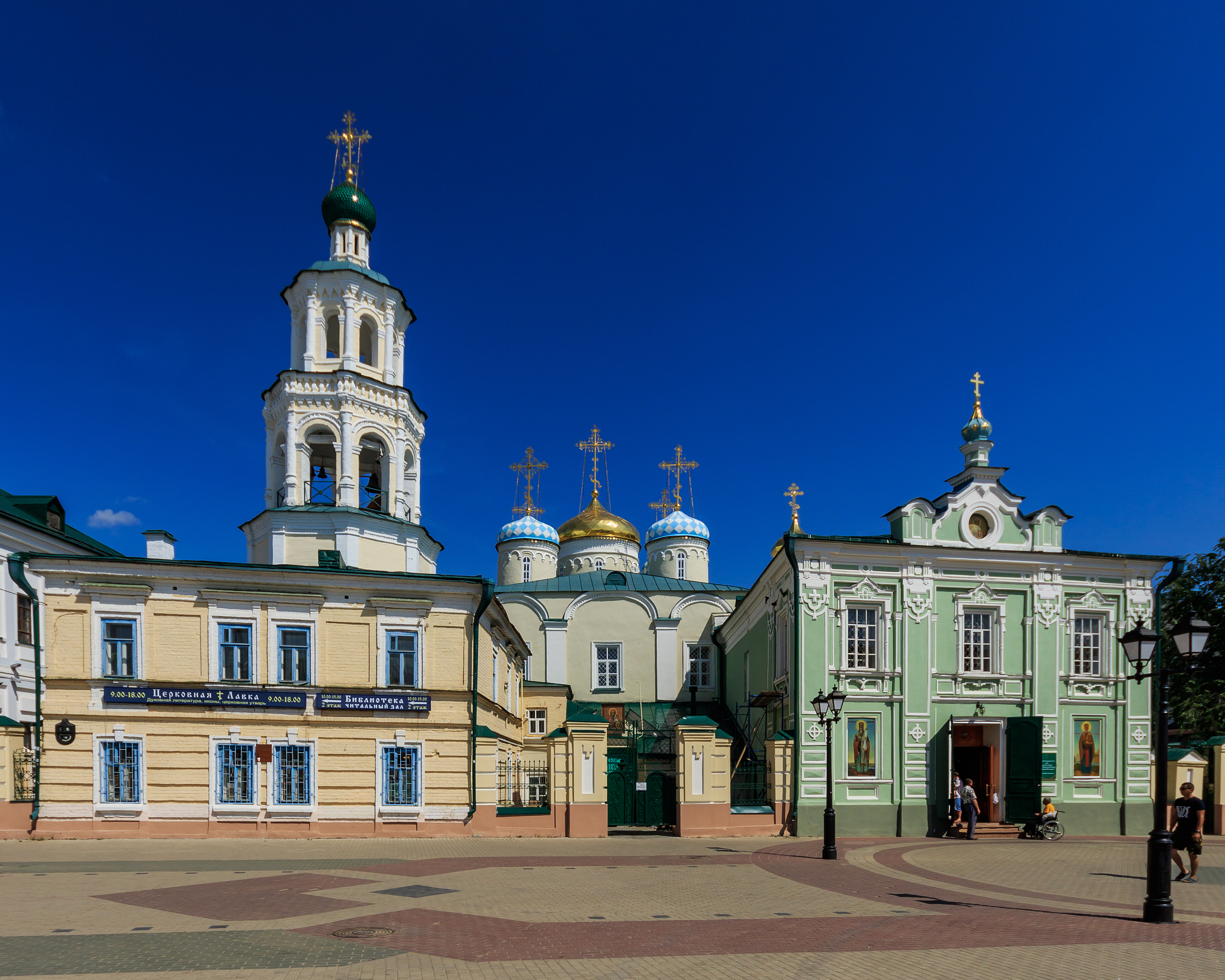
St. Nicholas Cathedral in Kazan, Tatarstan

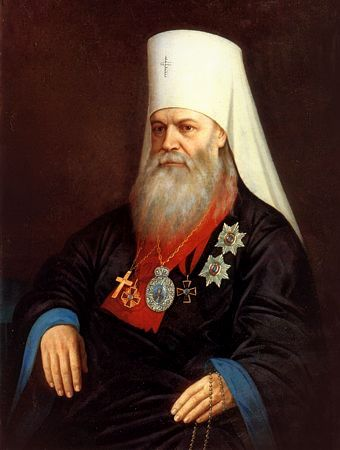
Macarius Bulgakov, was the Metropolitan of Moscow and Kolomna

A policy of Christianization of the Muslim Tatars was enacted by the Russian authorities, beginning in 1552, resulting in the emergence of Kryashens (keräşen / keräşennär), also known as "Christianized Tatars". In the 16th century, Ivan the Terrible forcefully Christianized many Volga Tatars, beginning a wave of persecutions and forced conversions under later Russian rulers and Orthodox clergy until the mid-eighteenth century. Kryahsen Tatars live in much of the Volga-Ural area. Today, they tend to be assimilated among the Russians and other Tatar groups.

In the 19th century, numerous Turkic groups within the Russian Empire, such as the Nağaybäk, Chuvash of Chuvashia, and Yakuts of the Sakha Republic, increasingly adopted Russian ways of life. Many of these communities converted en masse to Russian Orthodox Christianity, reflecting the broader cultural and religious influences of the empire during this period. Most Nağaybäks are Christian and were largely converted during the 18th century.

Prominent Christians of Tatar descent include Macarius Bulgakov, who served as the Metropolitan of Moscow and Kolomna from 1879 to 1882. He was a member of numerous learned societies, including the Russian Academy of Sciences, and is regarded as one of the foremost church historians of the 19th century Russian Empire. Another notable figure is Sergei Bulgakov, a Russian Orthodox theologian, priest, philosopher, and economist. Orthodox writer and scholar David Bentley Hart has referred to Bulgakov as "the greatest systematic theologian of the twentieth century", noting that he came from a lineage of Orthodox priests of Tatar descent spanning six generations.

===== The Molokans =====
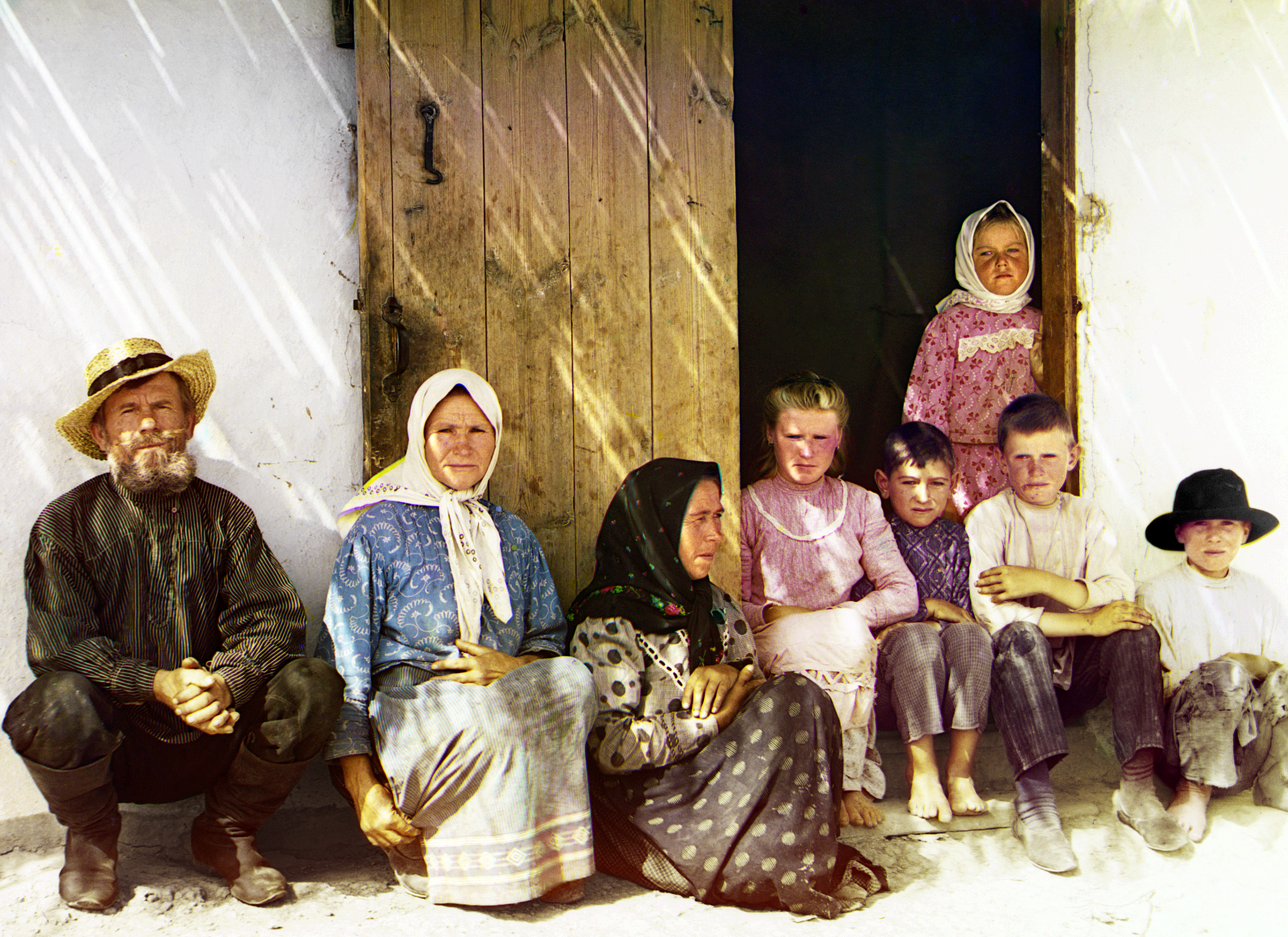
A family of Molokans in the Mughan steppe of Azerbaijan, c. 1910

The Molokans are a Christian ethnoreligious group and a Russian Spiritual Christian sect that originated from Eastern Orthodoxy in the East Slavic lands. Molokans from Tambov, who proselytized in settlements along the Volga River and in the Orenburg, Saratov, and Astrakhan provinces, were primarily of Slavic descent. By the 17th century, Tambov Oblast had been completely settled by Slavic people. The regions where they spread their teachings had significant populations of Muslims and individuals of Tatar or Turkic ancestry.

Between the 1600s and the late 1800s, intermarriage between ethnic Russians and Tatars (with "Tatar" referring broadly to those of Turkic background) was common. For a Tatar, marrying a Russian could enhance social status. Muslim Tatars who converted to Christianity gained exemptions from taxes and other privileges. It is well known that a segment of ethnic Russians has mixed ancestry that includes Middle Eastern or Mongolic Turkic influences alongside Slavic roots. The idea that Molokans have a blend of Slavic and Turkic genetics is also supported by various accounts.

Molokans complicated the Eastern Orthodox Church's efforts to convert Tatar or Turkic Muslims, as they taught that religious iconography was a sin. Known for their iconoclastic beliefs —deemed heretical by the Orthodox Church— Molokans attracted some Muslims, who found resonance in their preservation of certain Islamic traditions. Additionally, some Muslim converts in Russia were known to adopt Christianity for the benefits it conferred. As Molokans generally practiced endogamy and married within their faith, they would accept converts regardless of their ethnic background.

==== Elsewhere ====
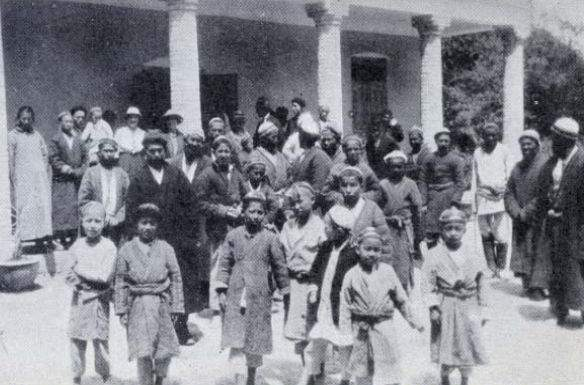
Uighur Christians outside the church at Kashgar in the early 1930s

There had been Christian conversions among Uighur Muslims in the late 19th and early 20th centuries, but these were suppressed by the First East Turkestan Republic government agents. In 1904, George W. Hunter with the China Inland Mission opened the first mission station for CIM in Xinjiang. But already in 1892, the Mission Covenant Church of Sweden started missions in the area around Kashgar, and later built mission stations, churches, hospitals and schools in Yarkant and Yengisar. Because of persecution, the churches were destroyed and the believers were scattered. From 1894 to 1938, many Uighur Muslims converted to Christianity. They were killed, tortured and jailed. Christian missionaries were expelled. According to the national census, 0.5% or 1,142 Uyghurs in Kazakhstan were Christians in 2009.

According to the historian Geoffrey Blainey from the University of Melbourne, since the 1960s there has been a substantial increase in the number of conversions from Islam to Christianity, mostly to the Evangelical and Pentecostal forms. Turkic Christians of Muslim background communities can be found in Azerbaijan, Bulgaria, Germany, Kazakhstan, Kyrgyzstan, Russia, Turkey, and Uzbekistan.

== Christian-majority Turkic peoples ==
The main Turkic Christian peoples include the Chuvash of Chuvashia, the Gagauz of Moldova, and the Yakuts of the Sakha Republic. The vast majority of Yakuts, Chuvash and the Gagauz are Eastern Orthodox Christians.

=== Chuvash people ===
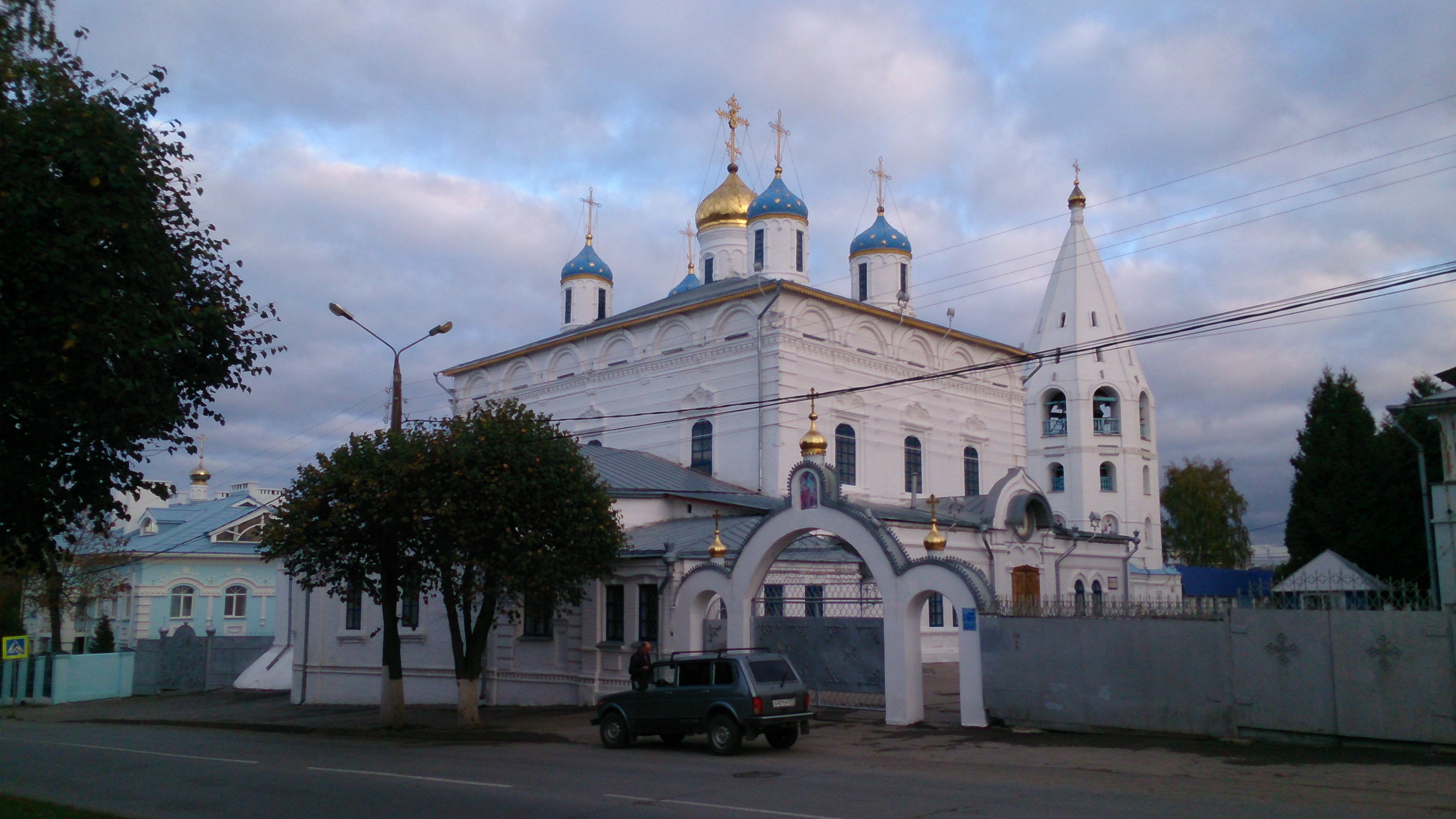
Vvedensky Cathedral, is a key church for the Chuvash community

The Chuvash people are a Turkic ethnic group, a branch of the Ogurs, native to an area stretching from the Idel-Ural (Volga-Ural) region to Siberia. Most of them live in Chuvashia and the surrounding areas, although Chuvash communities may be found throughout the Russian Federation. They speak Chuvash, a Turkic language that diverged from other languages in the family more than a millennium ago. Among the Chuvash believers, the majority are Eastern Orthodox Christians although a minority follow Sunni Islam or Vattisen Yaly. The traditional religion of the Chuvash of Russia, while containing many ancient Turkic concepts, also shares some elements with Zoroastrianism, Khazar Judaism, and Islam. Most Chuvash converted to Eastern Orthodox Christianity in the latter half of the 19th century, leading to the alignment of their festivals and rites with Orthodox Christian observances and the replacement of traditional practices with Christian ones. Despite this, a minority of Chuvash continue to practice their ancestral faith.

=== Gagauz people ===
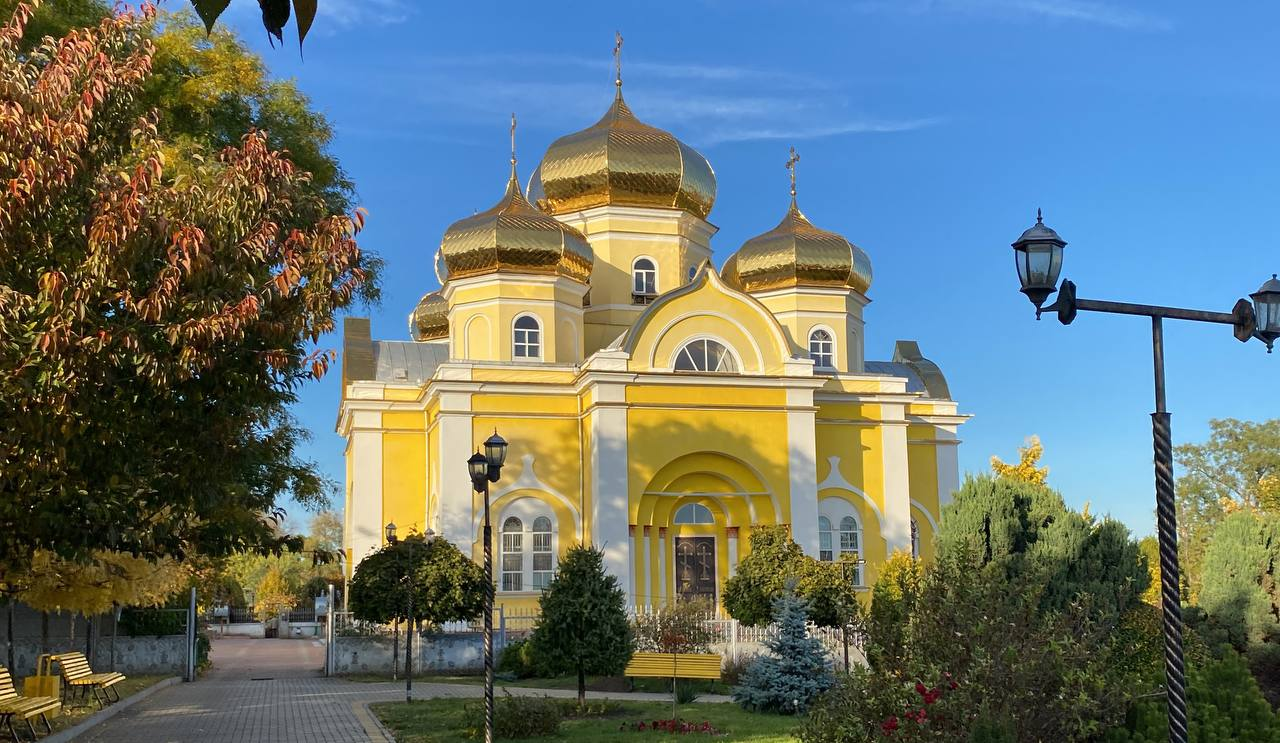
Saint John the Baptist Cathedral in Gagauzia serves as a central church for the Gagauz community

The Gagauz are a Turkic ethnic group native to southern Moldova (Gagauzia, Taraclia District, Basarabeasca District) and southwestern Ukraine (Budjak). Gagauz are mostly Eastern Orthodox Christians. The term Gagauz is also often used as a collective naming of Turkic people living in the Balkans, speaking the Gagauz language, a language separated from Balkan Gagauz Turkish. The Turkic thesis is divided into two main subgroups. The first posits that the Gagauz are descendants of the Pechenegs and Kumans, who migrated south from the north into Bulgaria, where they mingled with the Oghuz Turks. This theory could explain their Christian faith; however, there are no signs of a Kipchak origin in the Gagauz language, which is exclusively Western Oghuz and classified as a Turkish dialect. The second subgroup suggests a purely Oghuz origin. It argues that a group of Seljuk Turks from Anatolia migrated to the Byzantine Empire in the 13th century, adopted Christianity, and were settled by the Byzantine Emperor in Dobruja, an area that is now part of Bulgaria and Romania.

Most of Orthodox Gagauzs belong to the Moldovan Orthodox Church (formally known as Metropolis of Chișinău and All Moldova), which is subordinate to the Russian Orthodox Church. There have been a number of attempts from the 1930s into the 21st century to tie the Turkish Orthodox Patriarchate with the ethnically Turkic, Greek Orthodox Gagauz minority in Bessarabia.

=== Kryashen people ===
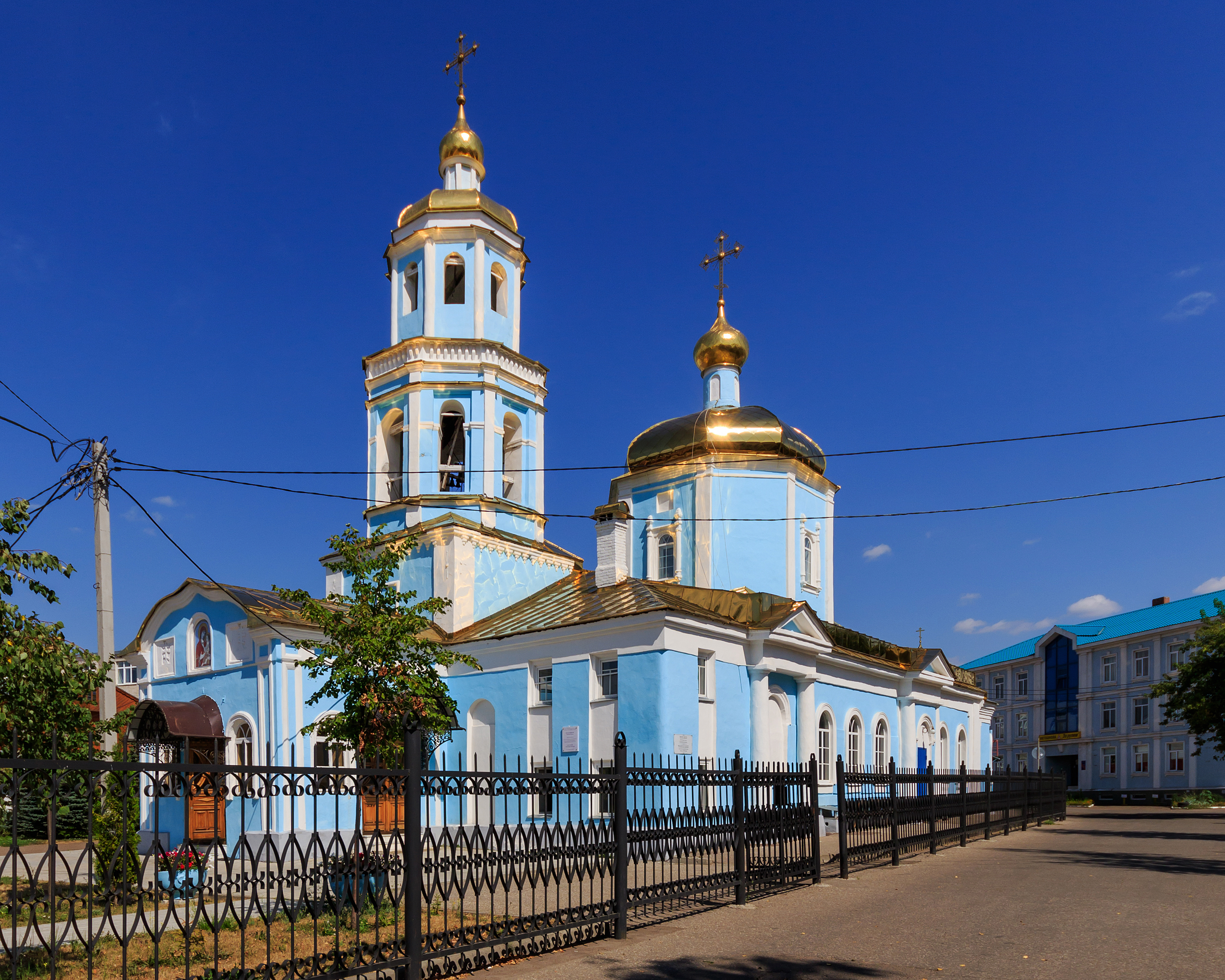
Tikhvinskaya church Kazan, is a key church for the Kryashen community

Kryashens are a sub-group of the Volga Tatars, with the vast majority being Orthodox Christians. A policy of Christianization of the Muslim Tatars was enacted by the Russian authorities, beginning in 1552, resulting in the emergence of Kryashens (keräşen / keräşennär), also known as "Christianized Tatars". In the 16th century, Ivan the Terrible forcefully Christianized many Volga Tatars, beginning a wave of persecutions and forced conversions under later Russian rulers and Orthodox clergy until the mid-eighteenth century. Kryahsen Tatars live in much of the Volga-Ural area. Today, they tend to be assimilated among the Russians and other Tatar groups.

During Soviet times, an alternative version for the ethnogenesis of Kryashens emerged, which suggested that their ancestors adopted Christianity voluntarily during times of Volga Bulgaria. Historian Maxim Glukhov connected their roots to Keraites.

The Kryashens had little religious and educational infrastructure in the 16th and 17th centuries. However, during the 18th century they were given many privileges and facilities were built or accommodated for the Kryashens. The first Tatar school for converts was established in 1863 while the first seminary was founded in 1872.

=== Others ===
The Nağaybäk, a subgroup of Volga Tatars and an indigenous Turkic people in Russia, are predominantly Christian, having been largely converted to Christianity during the 18th century. During the 19th century, many Khakas accepted the Russian ways of life, and most were converted en masse to Russian Orthodox Christianity.

== Christian minorities among Muslim-majority Turkic peoples ==
=== In Azerbaijan ===
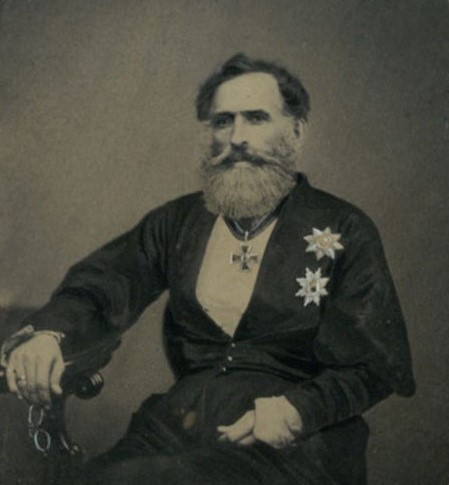
Alexander Kasimovich Kazembek was a prominent Azerbaijani Christian

Some Azerbaijanis of the Republic of Azerbaijan are believed to be descended from the inhabitants of Caucasian Albania, an ancient country located in the eastern Caucasus region, and various Iranian peoples which settled the region. They claim there is evidence that, due to repeated invasions and migrations, the aboriginal Caucasian population may have gradually been culturally and linguistically assimilated, first by Iranian peoples, such as the Persians, and later by the Oghuz Turks.

Considerable information has been learned about the Caucasian Albanians, including their language, history, early conversion to Christianity, and relations with the Armenians and Georgians, under whose strong religious and cultural influence the Caucasian Albanians came in the coming centuries. Christian Azerbaijanis number around 5,000 people in the Republic of Azerbaijan and consist mostly of recent converts. In recent years, some Azerbaijanis in Iran have begun converting to Christianity, which is strictly prohibited and can result in imprisonment.

=== In Central Asia ===
According to 2009 national census 39,172 ethnic Kazakhs are Christians (0.38% of all Kazakhstani Kazakhs). A 2015 study estimates some 19,000 Christians from a Muslim background residing in Kyrgyzstan, though not all are necessarily citizens of Kyrgyzstan. While other scholars estimated the total number of Muslim Kyrgyz converts to Christianity between 25,000 to 50,000, although the government disputes that figure. Exact numbers of Muslim Kyrgyz converts to Christianity vary but an estimate of around 20,000 is generally accepted among scholars. A 2015 study estimates some 10,000 Muslim Uzbek converted to Christianity, most of them belonging to some sort of evangelical or charismatic Protestant community. According to 2009 national census 1,794 Uzbeks in Kazakhstan are Christians. In Russia there are some long-term Uzbek workers who have converted to Eastern Orthodoxy through missionaries.

=== In Iraq ===
A minority of the Iraqi Turkmen are Roman Catholics, and their number was estimated at about 30,000 in 2015. In 2017, they comprised around 1% of the Iraqi Turkmen. Iraqi Turkmen Catholics were distinct from Citadel Christians. Iraqi Turkmen Catholics were Latin Catholic and lived all through Turkmeneli, including Kirkuk. The Citadel Christians were Chaldean Catholic and lived solely in Kirkuk. Furthermore, Citadel Christians were ethnically Assyrian whereas the Iraqi Turkmen Catholics were ethnically Turkic. Citadel Christians, numbering "a few thousand" in 2017, were significantly fewer than Iraqi Turkmen Catholics. In 2021, the Turkmen Bible Partnership translated the New Testament into the Iraqi Turkmen dialect and printed and distributed 2,000 copies.

=== In Turkey ===
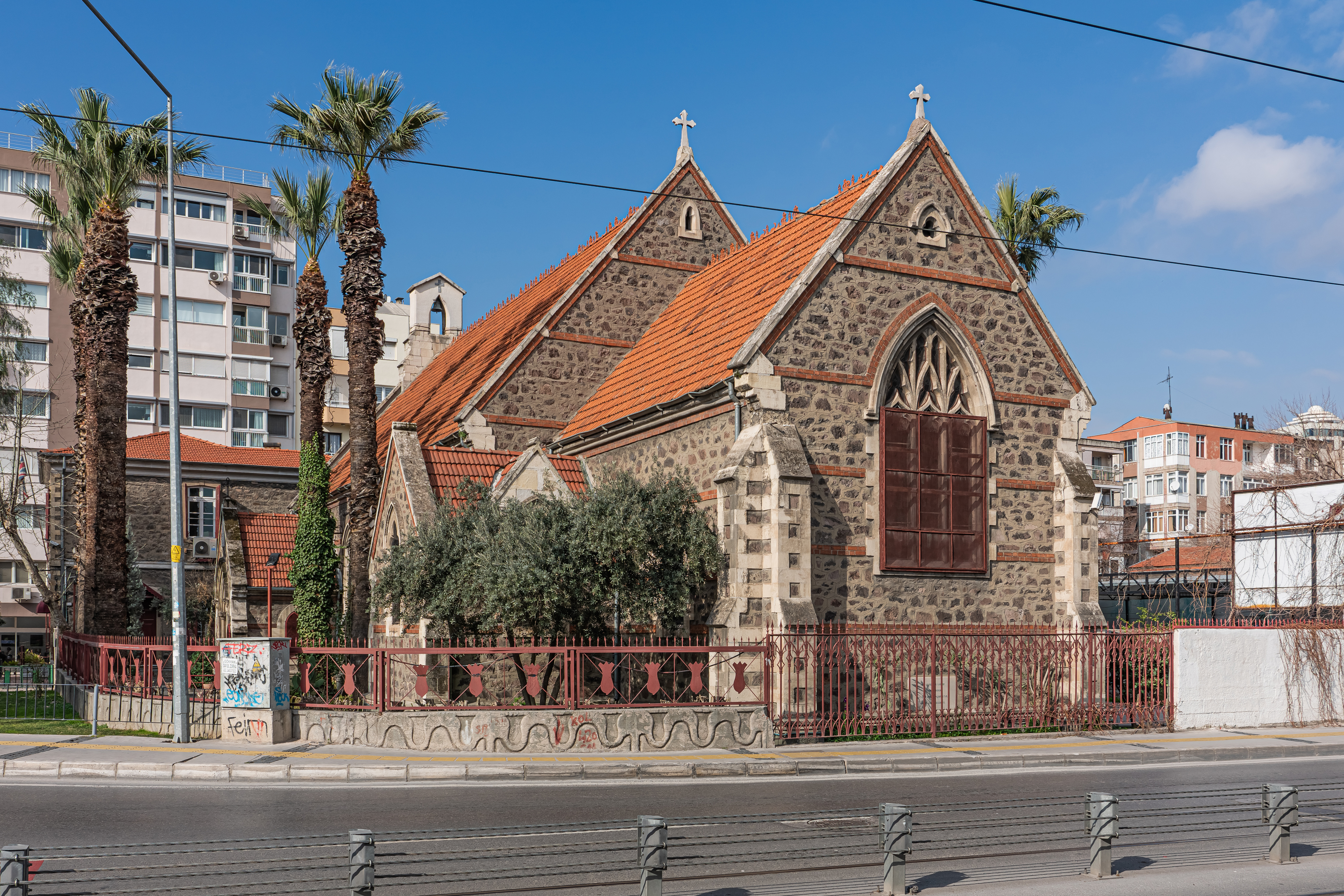
St. John the Evangelist's Anglican Church in İzmir, is a key church for the ethnic Christian Turkish community

There is an ethnic Turkish Protestant Christian community in Turkey numbering around ~10,000, mostly adherents, and most of them coming from a Muslim Turkish background. In 2003, the Milliyet newspaper claimed that 35,000 Turkish Muslims had converted to Christianity. A 2015 study estimates about 4,500 Christians are from a previous Muslim background in the country. While other sources estimated the number of the Turkish who converted to Christianity (most of them secret worshippers) between 4,000–6,000, or more than those numbers. Though, there are several significant and major Protestant churches and worship sites in Turkey protected legally, most of them are located in the 4 large cities of Istanbul, Izmir, Ankara and Bursa.

Prominent ethnic Turkish Christians include Paul Mulla, Antuan Ilgit and Julio Murat, these Turkish prelates of the Catholic Church; Nazlı Tolga, a journalist; Leyla Gencer, an operatic soprano; Ziya Meral, a scientist and economist; Rabia Kazan, an author and activist; Tunch Ilkin, a football player; along with Hakan Taştan and Turan Topal.

== Turkic-speaking Assyrians ==
=== Citadel Christians ===
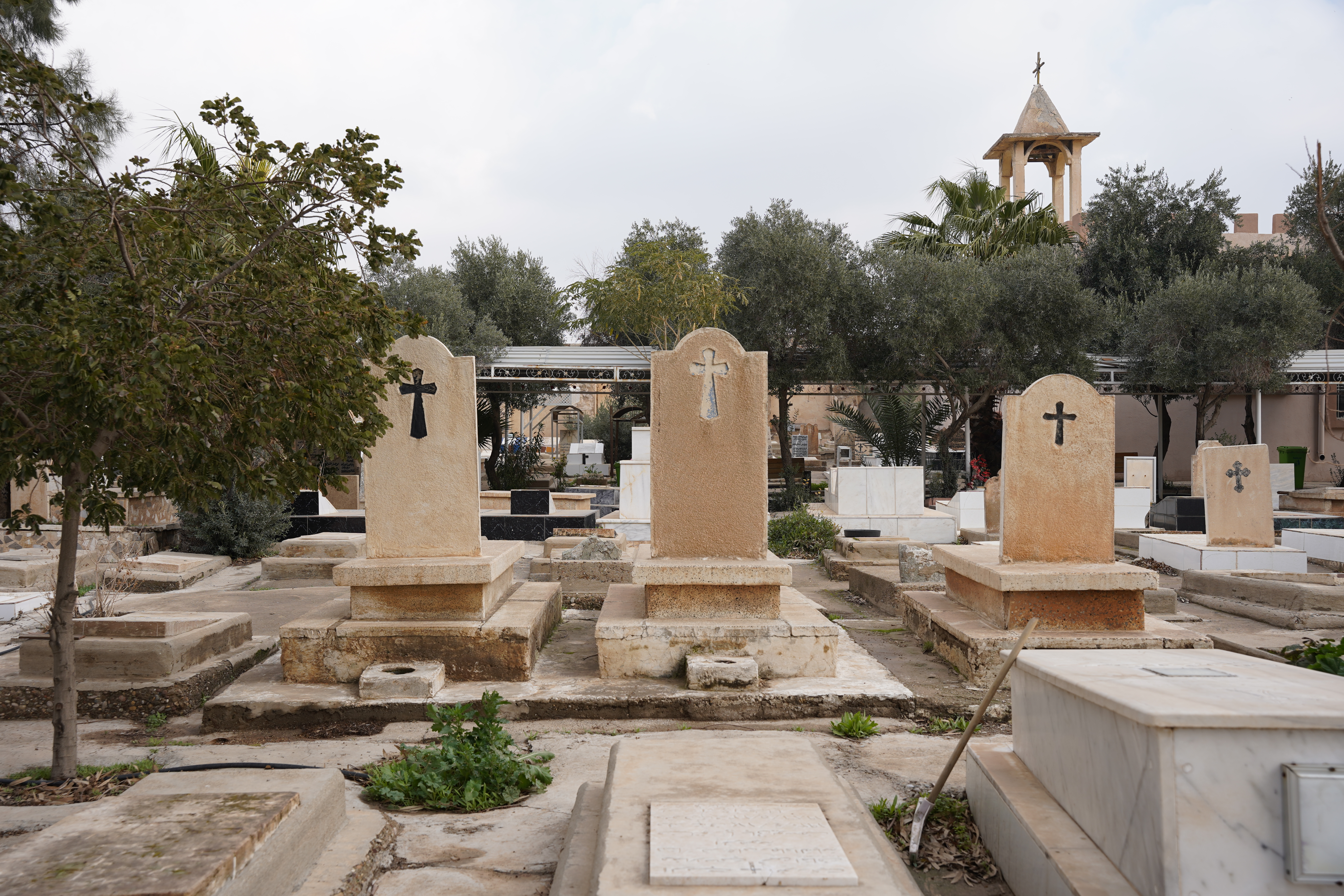
Tahmazkerd Church (Red Church), Kirkuk

The Citadel Christians (Turkish: Kale Hristiyanları; colloquially: قلعه مسیحیلری; romanised: Qəl‘ə Məsihiləri) are a community of ethnic Assyrians who speak their own dialect of Turkish and religiously follow the Chaldean Catholic Church. They are native to Kirkuk and have traditionally been the caretakers of the Kirkuk Citadel.

They are ethnic Assyrians from Kirkuk who lived in or near the citadel, where they adopted the Turkish language from Iraqi Turkmen, especially during the Ottoman Empire. Their dialect is mutually intelligible with the Iraqi Turkmen dialect. Their official hymns, eulogies, and prayers are in Turkish. Their bible is in the Ottoman Turkish language written in the 1800s and is recited by community leaders. The Citadel Christians are distinct from the community of Iraqi Turkmen who follow the Roman Catholic Church. Iraqi Turkmen Catholics were Latin Catholic and were a significantly larger community, numbering around 30,000 in 2015. They lived in all areas of Turkmeneli, including Kirkuk. The Citadel Christians were Chaldean Catholic, lived only in Kirkuk, and were ethnically Assyrian whereas the Iraqi Turkmen were ethnically Turkic.

The Citadel Christians, however, enjoyed good relations with Iraqi Turkmen and were both persecuted by the Ba'ath regime and the Islamic State. The Citadel Christians were described as a community of "a few thousand" in 2017. The Citadel Christians, and minorities in Kirkuk in general, had much cultural heritage destroyed by the Islamic State, and had most of their churches were shelled or destroyed, and many of them migrated. The community identifies as Assyrian, though they embrace their Turkish aspects and do not view themself as assimilated. A leader of the community stated that "our language since the days of our ancestors is Turkish, which we consider our mother tongue, and on top of that, we do not know anything about Chaldean. Our traditions of cooking, activity, culture, clothing, and civil life, are all Turkish". The Citadel Christians also saw the visit by Pope Francis to Iraq in 2021 as a symbol of hope for the future.

== Turkic-speaking Greeks ==
The Karamanlides (Greek: Καραμανλήδες, romanized: Karamanlídes; Turkish: Karamanlılar), also known as Karamanli Greeks or simply Karamanlis, are a traditionally Turkish-speaking Greek Orthodox people native to the region of Karaman in Anatolia.

Some scholars regard Karamanlides as the Turkish-speaking Greeks from Karaman, though their exact ethnic origin is disputed; they could either be descendants of Byzantine Greeks who were linguistically Turkified, or of Christian Turkic soldiers who settled in the region after the Turkic conquests, or even both. The Karamanlides were forced to leave Anatolia during the 1923 population exchange between Greece and Turkey. Today, a majority of the population live in Greece and have fully integrated into Greek society.

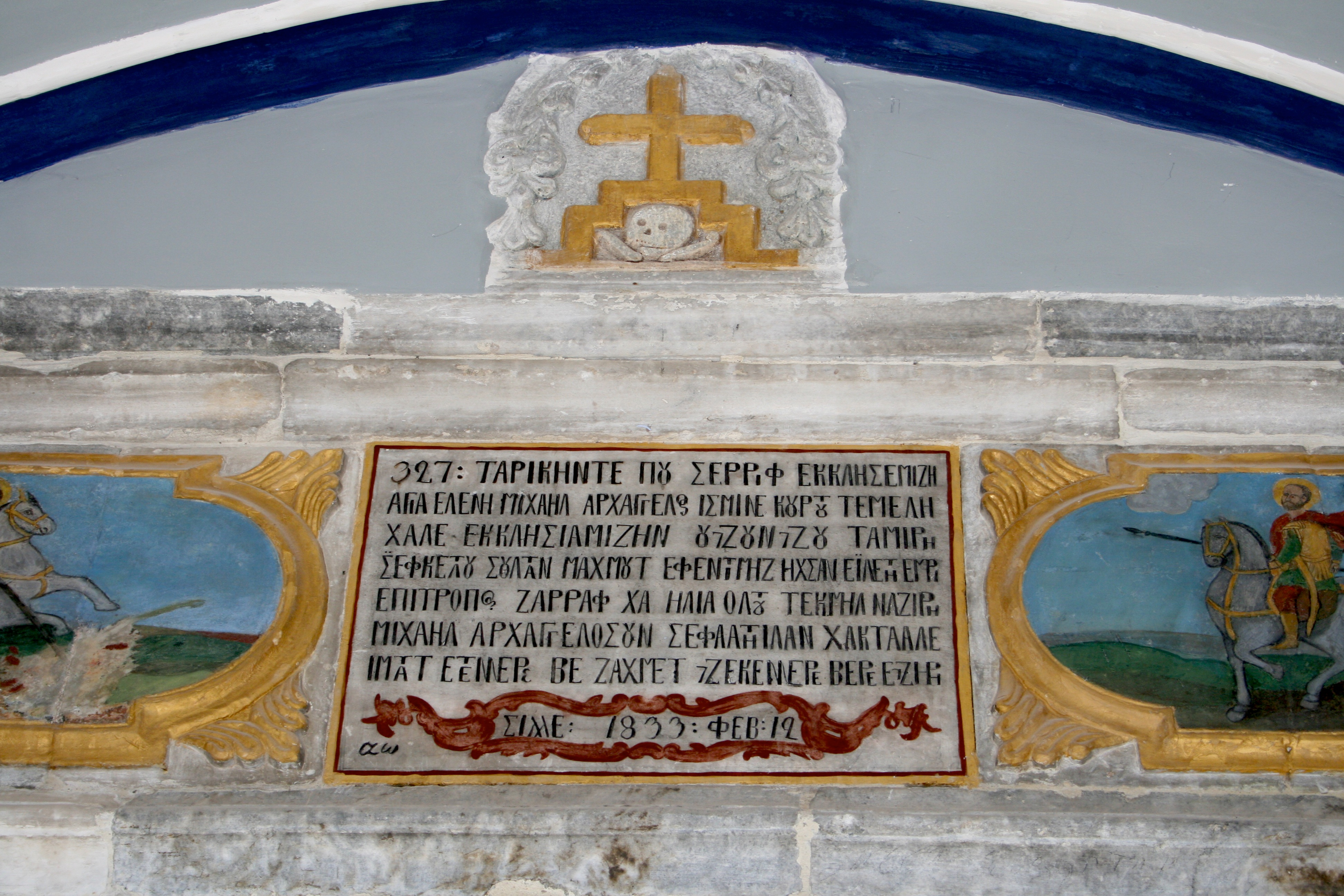
An inscription in Karamanli Turkish on the entrance of the former Greek Orthodox church of Agia Eleni in Sille, near Konya

The Urums (/ʊəˈruːm/, /ʊˈruːm/; Greek: Ουρούμ, Urúm; Turkish and Crimean Tatar: Urum, IPA: [uˈɾum]) are several groups of Turkic-speaking Greek Orthodox people native to Crimea. The emergence and development of the Urum identity took place from 13th to the 17th centuries. Bringing together the Crimean Greeks along with Greek-speaking Crimean Goths, with other indigenous groups that had long inhabited the region, resulting in a gradual transformation of their collective identity.

=== Caucasus Greeks ===
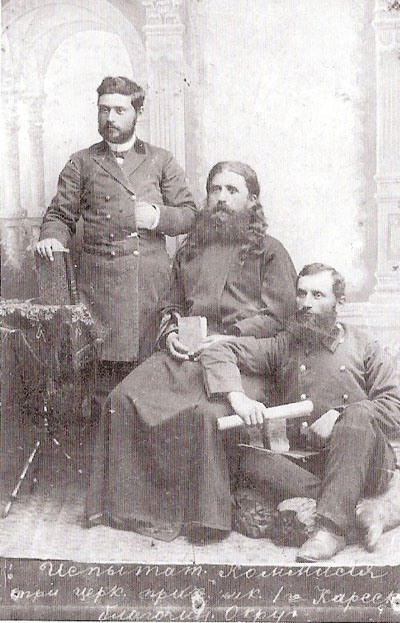
Caucasus Greek cleric and community leaders

The Caucasus Greeks or more commonly Καυκάσιοι Έλληνες, also known as the Greeks of Transcaucasia and Russian Asia Minor, are the ethnic Greeks of the North Caucasus and Transcaucasia in what is now southwestern Russia, Georgia, and northeastern Turkey. These specifically include the Pontic Greeks, though they today span a much wider region including the Russian north Caucasus, and the former Russian Caucasus provinces of the Batum Oblast' and the Kars Oblast' (the so-called Russian Asia Minor), now in north-eastern Turkey and Adjara in Georgia. A large number of Caucasus Greeks who settled in Georgia became referred to as Urum (from the Turkish for '[Byzantine] Romans') and spoke a Turkish dialect with a large admixture of Pontic Greek, Georgian, and Armenian vocabulary. According to local Greek legend, after the suppression of their revolt against Ottoman rule, these Turkish-speaking but Christian Orthodox Caucasus Greeks had been given the choice by Sultan Selim I either to accept Islam but continue to use their Greek mother tongue, or to use the Turkish language but retain their Christian Orthodox faith. Selim I had been based in the Trebizond region before he became Sultan in 1512, since he was himself of partly Pontic Greek origin on the side of his mother Gülbahar Hatun.

Nevertheless, most Caucasus Greeks had never had to face this predicament of having to choose between their Christian Orthodox faith and their Pontic Greek language and so were able to retain both, although when in Russian territory they eventually came to adopt Russian as their second language for public and educational purposes. Caucasus Greeks also often maintained some command of Turkish as more or less a third language, thanks to their own roots in north-eastern Anatolia, where they had after all lived (usually very uneasily and in a state of intermittent warfare) alongside Turkish-speaking Muslims since the Seljuk-backed Turkish migrations into 'the lands of Rum' or Anatolia during the 11th and 12th centuries. Pontic Greeks in Georgia and the Russian Caucasus also maintained this command of Turkish so as to communicate with their Muslim neighbours living in the region, most of whom used Turkish as a lingua franca or even adopted it as their first language irrespective of actual ethnic origin.

== Turkic churches ==
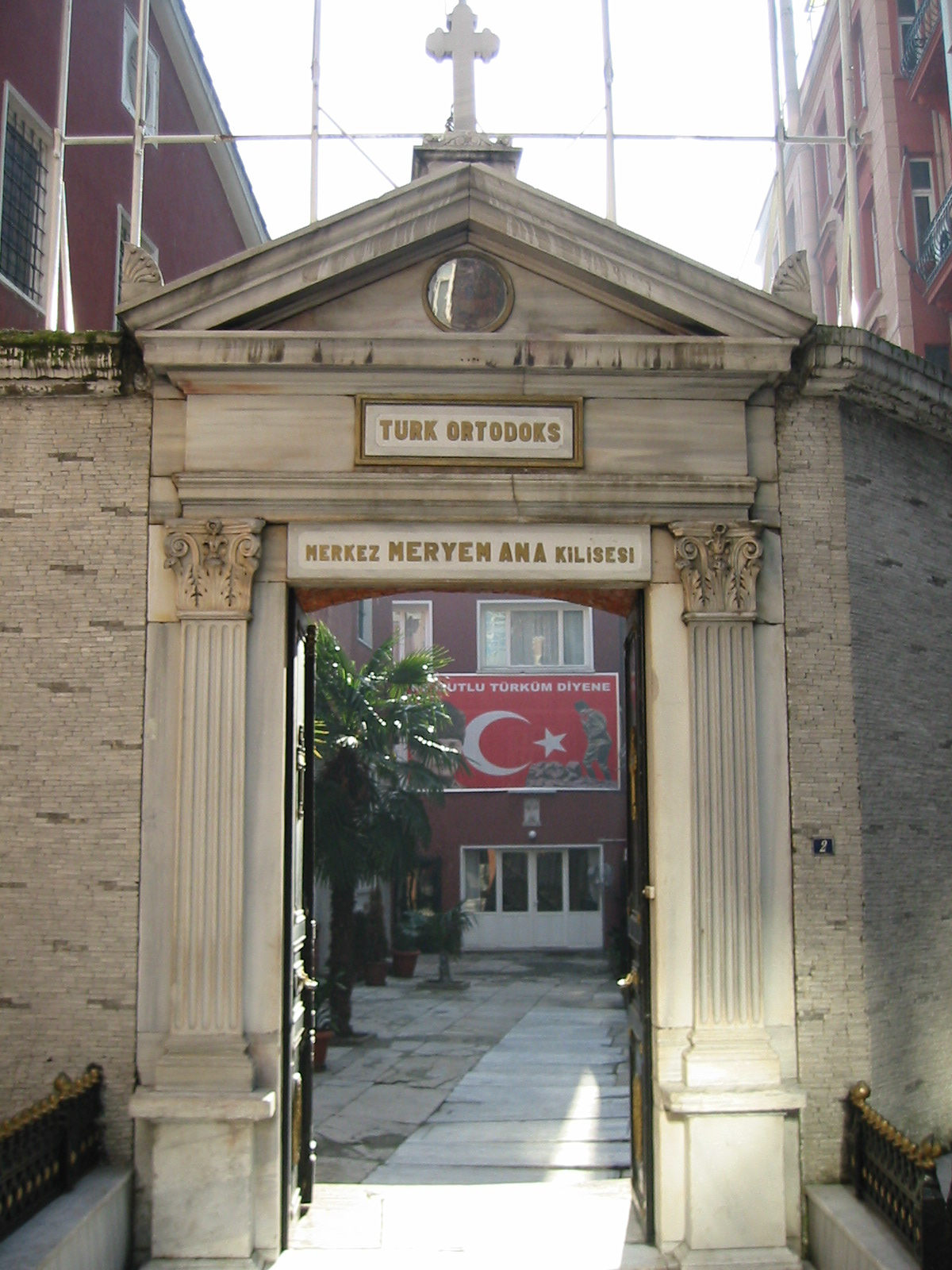
Entrance to the Meryem Ana church, headquarters of the Autocephalous Turkish Orthodox Patriarchate in Galata, Istanbul

The Autocephalous Turkish Orthodox Patriarchate (Turkish: Bağımsız Türk Ortodoks Patrikhanesi), also referred to as the Turkish Orthodox Church (Turkish: Türk Ortodoks Kilisesi), is an unrecognized autocephalous Eastern Orthodox organisation based in Turkey, descending from Turkish-speaking Eastern Orthodox Christians. It was founded in Kayseri by Pavlos Karahisarithis, who became the patriarch and took the name of Papa Eftim I, in 1922.

In 1922 a pro-Turkish Eastern Orthodox group, the General Congregation of the Anatolian Turkish Orthodox (Turkish: Umum Anadolu Türk Ortodoksları Cemaatleri), was set up with the support from the Orthodox bishop of Havza, as well as a number of other congregations

On 15 September 1922 the Autocephalous Orthodox Patriarchate of Anatolia was founded in Kayseri by Pavlos Karahisarithis, a supporter of the General Congregation of the Anatolian Turkish Orthodox. On 6 June 1924, in a conference in the Church of the Virgin Mary (Meryem Ana in Turkish) in Galata, it was decided to transfer the headquarters of the Turkish Orthodox Patriarchate from Kayseri to Istanbul. In the same session it was also decided that the Church of Virgin Mary would become the headquarter of the new Patriarchate of the Turkish Orthodox Church.

There have been a number of attempts from the 1930s into the 21st century to tie the Turkish Orthodox Patriarchate with the ethnically Turkic, Greek Orthodox Gagauz minority in Bessarabia. A similar project was put into motion in October 2018, when the Turkish president Recep Tayyip Erdoğan visited the Republic of Moldova and toured the Autonomous Territorial Unit of Gagauzia.

== Christian saints of Turkic origin ==
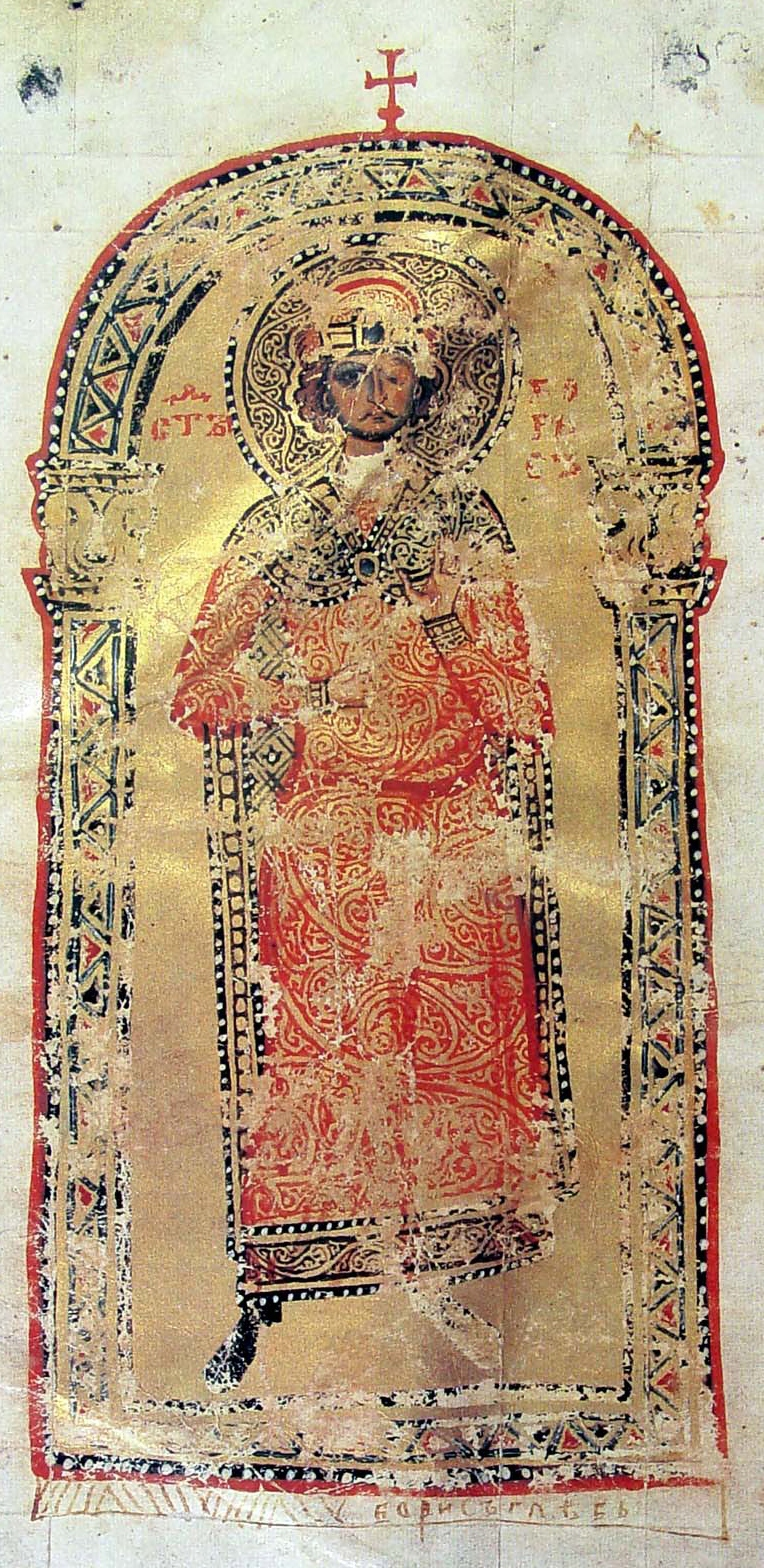
Boris I of Bulgaria

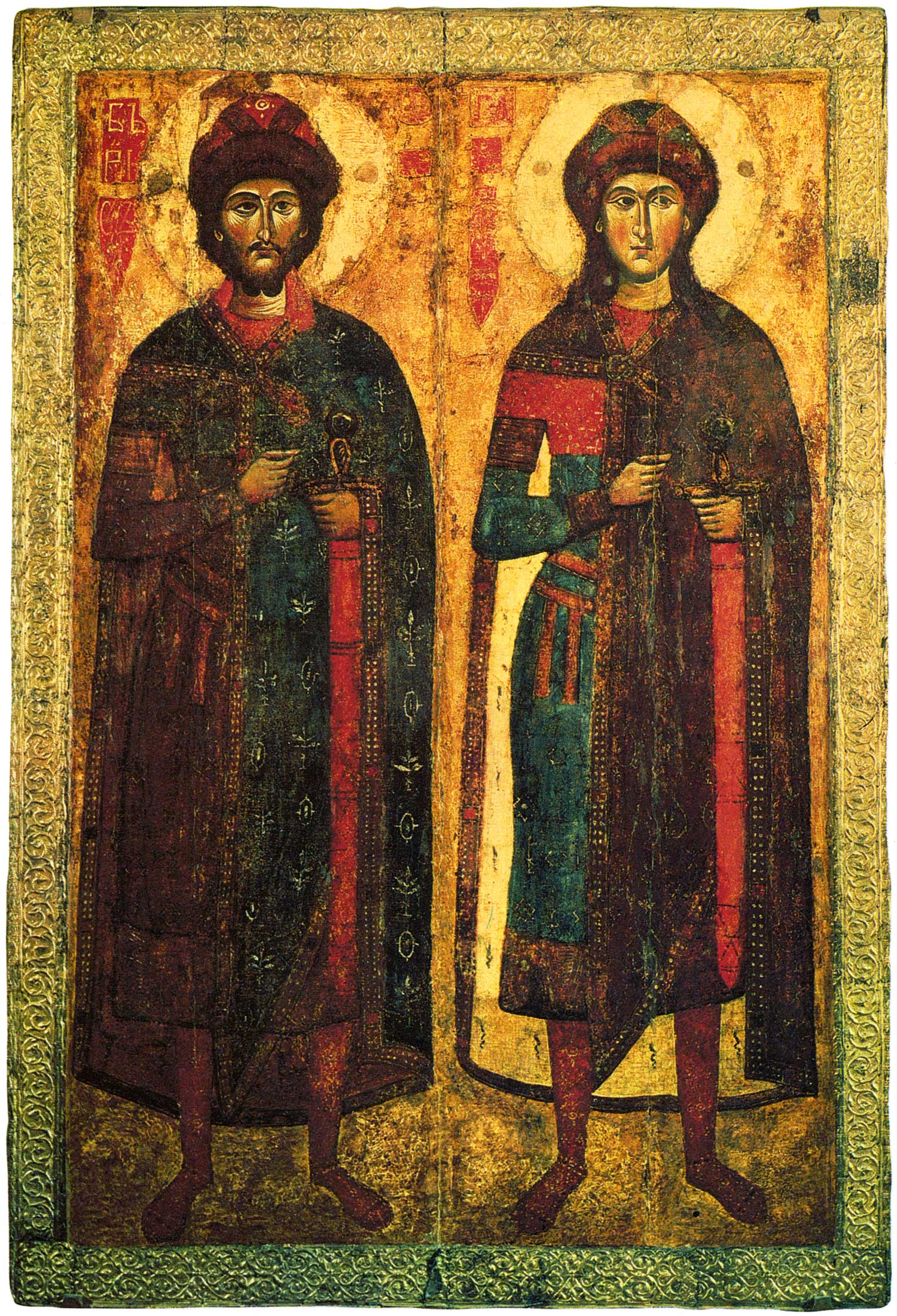
Boris and Gleb

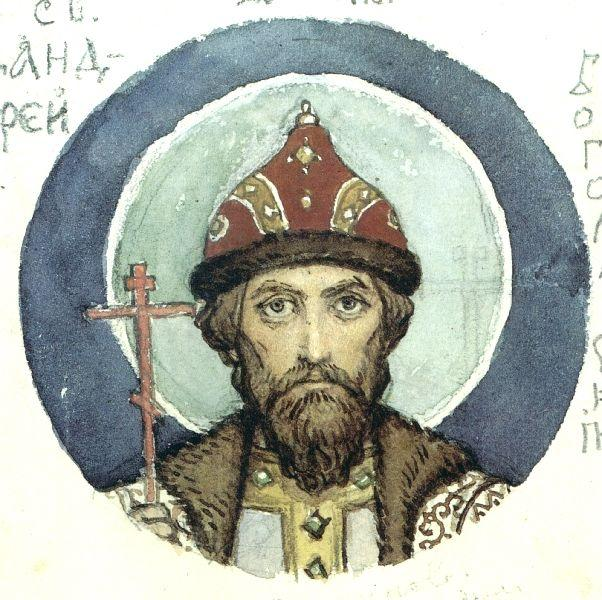
Andrey Bogolyubsky

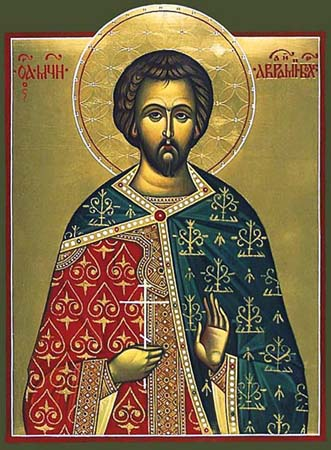
Abraham of Bulgaria

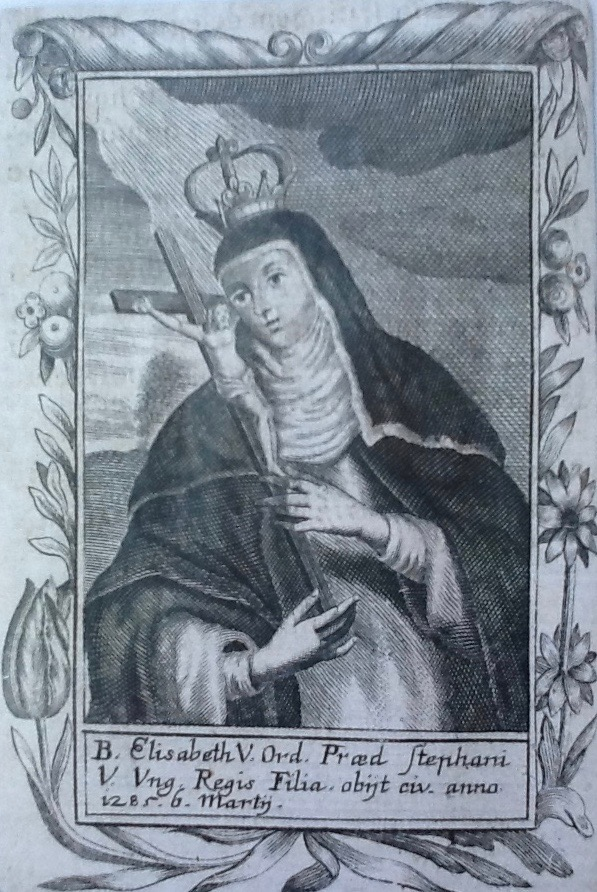
Elizabeth of Hungary, Queen of Serbia

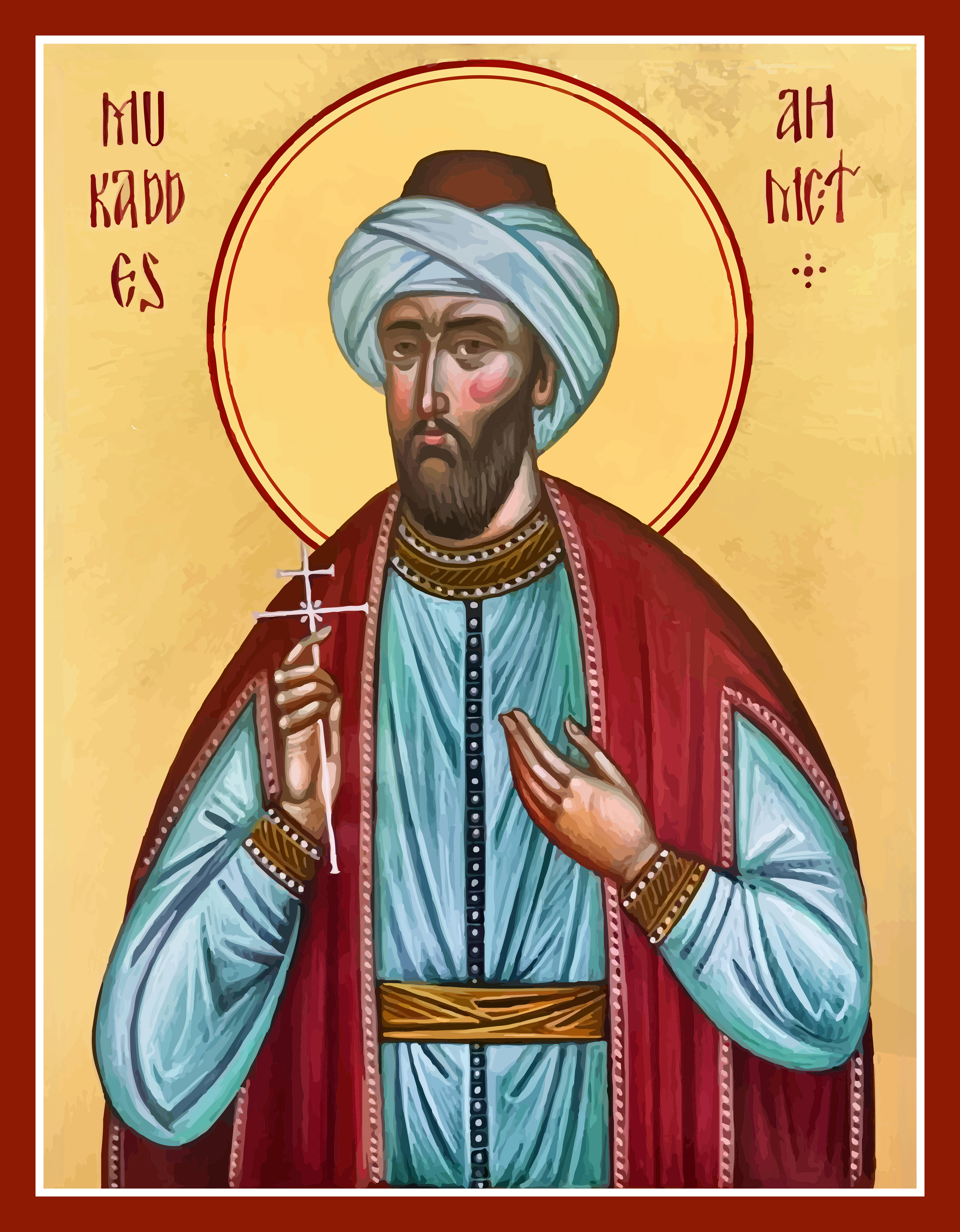
Ahmet the Calligrapher

== See also ==
- Patriarchate conflict in Turkey
- Johannes Avetaranian, a Turkish mullah who converted from Islam to Christianity
- Mehmet Ali Ağca, former Grey Wolves militant who attempted to assassinate Pope John Paul II, converted from Islam to Christianity
- Turcopole
