= George (Ongud king) =

- King of Onguds

Prince of Gaotang
- Reign: 1294 – 1298
- Predecessor: Aybuqa
- Successor: Yohannan
- Born: c. 1250
- Died: 1298 (aged 47–48)
- Burial: 1310; Guyuan, People's Republic of China
- Spouse: Qudadmiš; Aiyašri
Posthumous name
- Chinese: 忠獻, romanized: Zhōngxiàn, lit. 'Loyal and Devoted'
- Father: Aybuqa
- Mother: Princess Yüelie (月烈)
- Religion: Church of the East, later Catholicism

George (Syriac: ܓܝܘܪܓܝܣ, romanized: Giwargis; Chinese: 阔里吉思; pinyin: Kuòlǐjísī; c. 1250 – 1298/1299) was the king of the Ongud and an official of the Yuan dynasty.

== Family ==
Chinese sources trace George's lineage back three generations. He was the son of Aybuqa, son of Boyoqa, son of Alagush Tegin Quri. His mother was Princess Yüelie, daughter of Kublai Khan.

George was married twice. His first wife was Qudadmiš, a daughter of Zhenjin. She died young and George married Aiyašri, a daughter of Khublai Khan's grandson Temür Khan. In the summer of 1294, he was granted the title "Prince of Gaotang" (高唐王 Gāotáng Wáng) by the Chinese sovereign.

== Life ==
George's birth date is not recorded, but analysis of his skeleton shows that he died at about forty years of age. He was described by Book of Yuan as "courageous and resolute by nature, trained in military affairs, and particularly devoted to Confucian learning." According to the book, he built the Hall of Ten Thousand Volumes in his private residence, where he daily engaged with scholars in discussions on the classics, history, metaphysics, cosmology, and numerology.

George belonged to the Church of the East. In 1294 or 1295, George met the Franciscan friar John of Montecorvino, who converted him to Catholicism. He gave John permission to construct a Catholic church in an Ongud capital, possibly Olon Süme. He took minor orders so that he could participate in the office of the Mass while wearing his royal robes. According to him, they had plans to translate Latin liturgy to George's language and script. John claims that George maintained his Catholic faith, but Li Tang points out that he maintained certain practices (such as prayers in Syriac) that could indicate that he remained attached to the Church of the East.

During the Yuan–Chagatai war, Temür Khan sent George to the western border to attack the Chagatai. In April 1297, he defeated them at the battle of Bayasi. In the winter of 1298, however, his garrison came under attack by the Chagatai leader Duwa; he was captured and executed. George was first buried at Bole. He was supposed be succeeded by his son John. But he was aged only two or three, therefore passing the line to Yohannan, George's brother. In 1310, John received permission from the Emperor Wuzong to bring his father's body back for burial in the family cemetery at Yelike'ersi. George's tomb has been found in Guyuan.

== Bibliography ==
- Marsone, Pierre (2013). "Two Portraits for One Man: George, King of the Önggüt". In Li Tang; Dietmar W. Winkler (eds.). From the Oxus River to the Chinese Shores: Studies on East Syriac Christianity in China and Central Asia. LIT Verlag. pp. 225–236.
- Osawa, Takashi; Lkhundev, Guunii; Saito, Shigeo; Takahashi, Hidemi (2015). "'As the Mountains Surround Jerusalem': Two Syriac Inscriptions at Ulaan Tolgoi (Doloon Nuur) in Western Mongolia". Hugoye. 18 (1): 191–206.
- Paolillo, Maurizio (2009). "In Search of King George". In Dietmar W. Winkler; Li Tang (eds.). Hidden Treasures and Intercultural Encounters: Studies on East Syriac Christianity in China and Central Asia. LIT Verlag. pp. 241–256.
- Tang, Li (2013). "Rediscovering the Ongut King George: Remarks on a Newly Excavated Archaeological Site". In Li Tang; Dietmar W. Winkler (eds.). From the Oxus River to the Chinese Shores: Studies on East Syriac Christianity in China and Central Asia. LIT Verlag. pp. 255–266.
- Tang, Li (2016). "The 'Nestorian' Ongut King George in Medieval Chinese, Latin and Syriac Sources". In Dietmar W. Winkler (ed.). Syrische Studien: Beiträge zum 8. Deutschen Syrologie-Symposium in Salzburg 2014. LIT Verlag. pp. 227–243.
- Zhao, George Qingzhi (2008). Marriage as Political Strategy and Cultural Expression: Mongolian Royal Marriages from World Empire to Yuan Dynasty. Peter Lang. ISBN 978-1433102752.
