= Christianity among the Mongols =

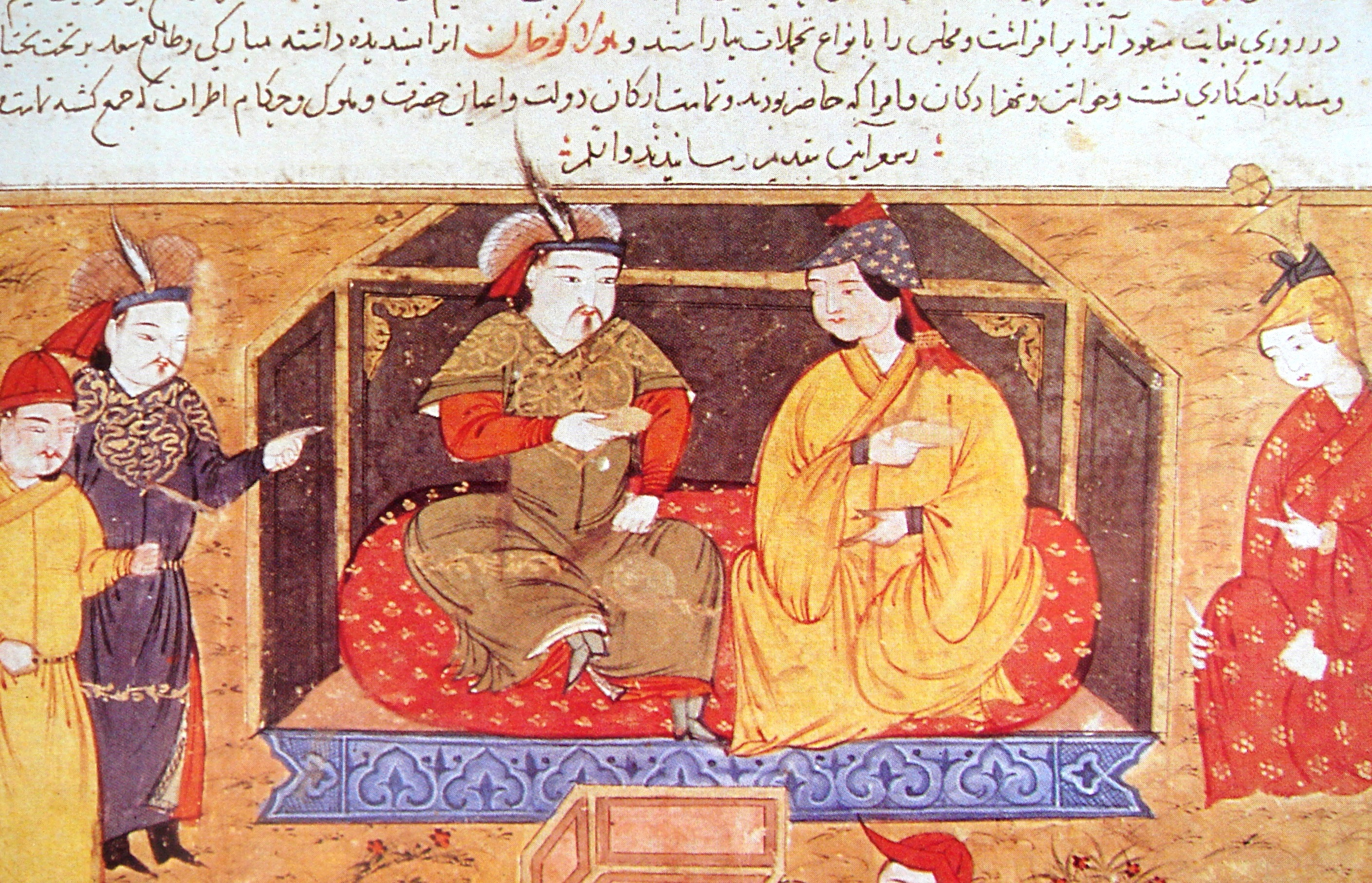
Hulagu Khan, grandson of Genghis Khan and founder of the Ilkhanate, seated with his Eastern Christian queen Doquz Khatun of the Keraites

In modern times the Mongols are predominantly Tibetan Buddhists, but in previous eras, especially during the time of the Mongol empire (13th–14th centuries), they were predominantly shamanist, and had a substantial minority of Christians, many of whom were in positions of considerable power. Overall, Mongols were highly tolerant of most religions, and typically sponsored several at the same time. Many Mongols had been proselytized by the Church of the East (sometimes called "Nestorian") since about the 7th century, and some tribes' primary religion was Christian. In the time of Genghis Khan, his sons took Christian wives of the Keraites, and under the rule of Genghis Khan's grandson, Möngke Khan, the primary religious influence was Christian.

The practice of Nestorian Christianity was somewhat different from that practiced in the West, and Europeans tended to regard Nestorianism as heretical for its beliefs about the nature of Jesus. However, the Europeans also had legends about a figure known as Prester John, a great Christian leader in the East who would come to help with the Crusades. One version of the legend connected the identity of Prester John with a Christian Mongol leader, Toghrul, leader of the Keraites.

Some Mongolians rejected the church structure and what was orthodox for the time, and borrowed elements from other religions and merged beliefs from several Christian denominations together. Some even identified Adam with the Buddha.

During the Mongols' siege of Baghdad, many of the citizens of the city were massacred, but Christians were spared. As the Mongols further encroached upon Palestine, there were some attempts at forming a Franco-Mongol alliance with the Christians of Europe against the Muslims.

Mongol contacts with the West also led to many missionaries, primarily Franciscan and Dominican, traveling eastward in attempts to convert the Mongols to Catholicism.

== Background ==
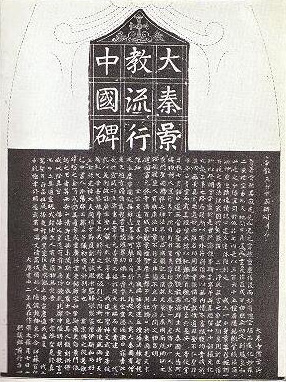
The Nestorian Stele in China, erected in 781

The Mongols had been proselytised since about the seventh century. Many Mongol tribes, such as the Keraites, the Naimans, the Merkit, the Ongud, and to a large extent the Qara Khitai (who practiced it side-by-side with Buddhism), were Nestorian Christian.

Genghis Khan himself believed in traditional Mongolian shamanism, but was tolerant of other faiths. When, as the young Temüjin, he swore allegiance with his men at the Baljuna Covenant in 1203, there were representatives of nine tribes among the 20 men, including "several Christians, three Muslims, and several Buddhists." His sons were married to Christian princesses of the Keraites clan who held considerable influence at his court. Under the Great Khan Mongke, Genghis's grandson, the main religious influence was that of the Nestorians.

Some of the major Christian figures among the Mongols were:

- Sorghaghtani Beki, daughter-in-law of Genghis Khan by his son Tolui, and mother of Möngke Khan, Kublai Khan, Hulagu Khan and Ariq Böke, who were also married to Christian princesses;
- Doquz Khatun, wife of Hulagu Khan and mother of Abaqa Khan, who for his part married Maria Palaiologina, daughter of the Byzantine emperor Michael VIII Palaiologos in 1265. After the death of Abaqa's mother Doquz, Maria filled her role as a major Christian influence in the Ilkhanate.
- Sartaq Khan, son of Batu Khan, who converted to Christianity during his lifetime;
- Kitbuqa, general of Mongol forces in the Levant, who fought in alliance with Christian vassals.
- Yahballaha III, an Ongud Mongol earlier known as Rabban Marcos, became the Patriarch of the Church of the East from 1281 to 1317.
- Rabban Bar Sauma, a Chinese monk who made a pilgrimage from Khanbaliq (now Beijing) and testified to the importance of Christianity among the Mongols during his visit to Rome in 1287.
- Nayan Khan, a Mongol nobleman and uncle of Kublai Khan. In 1287, after becoming increasingly angry with Kublai for being “too Chinese”, Nayan staged a rebellion. Since he was a nobleman and governor of four Mongol regions, Nayan had a significant army. He also allied with other Mongol governors who were themselves dissatisfied with Kublai's rejection of Mongol values, from their perspective. Nayan's battle standard had a cross on it because he was a Christian. Their rebellion was ultimately unsuccessful, and Nayan was quietly executed.

== Practice ==
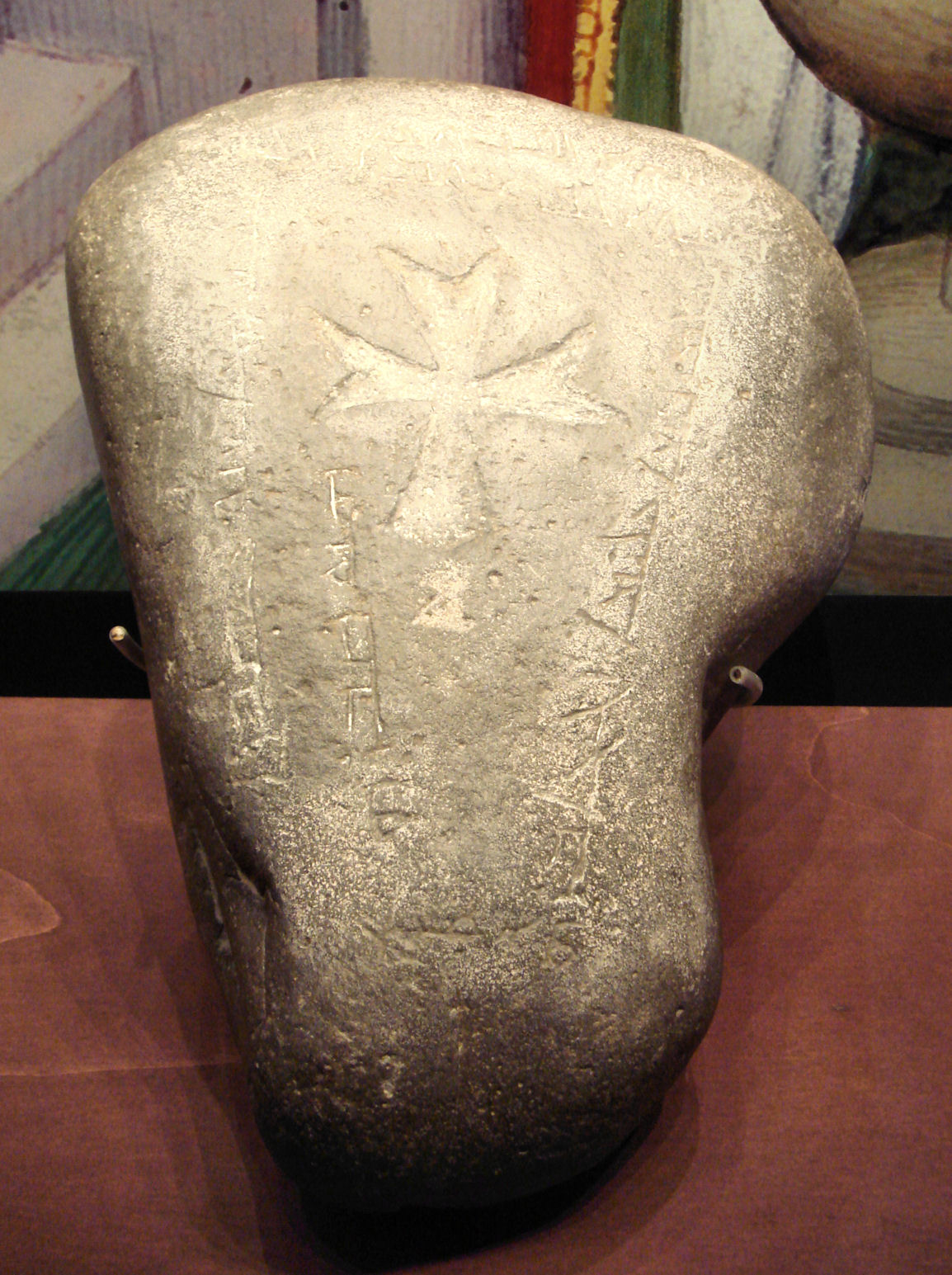
Nestorian tombstone with inscriptions in Syriac, found in Issyk Kul, dated 1312

According to popular anthropologist Jack Weatherford, because the Mongols had a primarily nomadic culture, their practice of Christianity was different from what might have been recognized by most Western Christians. The Mongols had no churches or monasteries, but claimed a set of beliefs that descended from the Apostle Thomas, which relied on wandering monks. Further, their style was based more on practice than belief. The primary interest in Christianity for many, was the story that Jesus had healed the sick and survived death, so the practice of Christianity became interwoven with the care of the sick. Jesus was considered to be a powerful shaman, and another attraction was that the name Jesus sounded like Yesu, the Mongol number "9". It was a sacred number to the Mongols, and was also the name of Genghis Khan's father, Yesugei. However, somewhat in contradiction to Weatherford, there is written evidence of a permanent Nestorian church in Karakorum and archeological evidence for other permanent church buildings in Olon Süme and Ukek. Another recent archeological example is Ilibalyk (Usharal, present-day Kazakhstan), where excavations conducted since 2016 have documented a medieval necropolis with carved grave slabs bearing Nestorian crosses and Syriac inscriptions, an associated funerary chapel, and over 100 excavated burials dating to roughly the 12th–14th centuries. The use of non-permanent (yurt) churches is also well-documented.

Again according to Weatherford, the Mongols also adapted the Christian cross to their own belief system, making it sacred because it pointed to the four directions of the world. They had varied readings of the Scriptures, especially feeling an affinity to the wandering Hebrew tribes. Christianity also allowed the eating of meat (different from the vegetarianism of the Buddhists). And of particular interest to the hard-drinking Mongols, they enjoyed that the consuming of alcohol was a required part of church services.

Women in Mongolia were known to indicate their faith by wearing an amulet inscribed with a cross, or to be tattooed with a cross.

== Keraite and Naiman Christian tribes ==
Mongol tribes that adopted Syriac Christianity ca. 600 – 1400

The Keraite tribe of the Mongols were converted to Nestorianism early in the 11th century. Other tribes evangelized entirely or to a great extent during the 10th and 11th centuries were the Naiman tribe. The Kara-Khitan Khanate also had a large proportion of Nestorian Christians, mingled with Buddhists and Muslims.

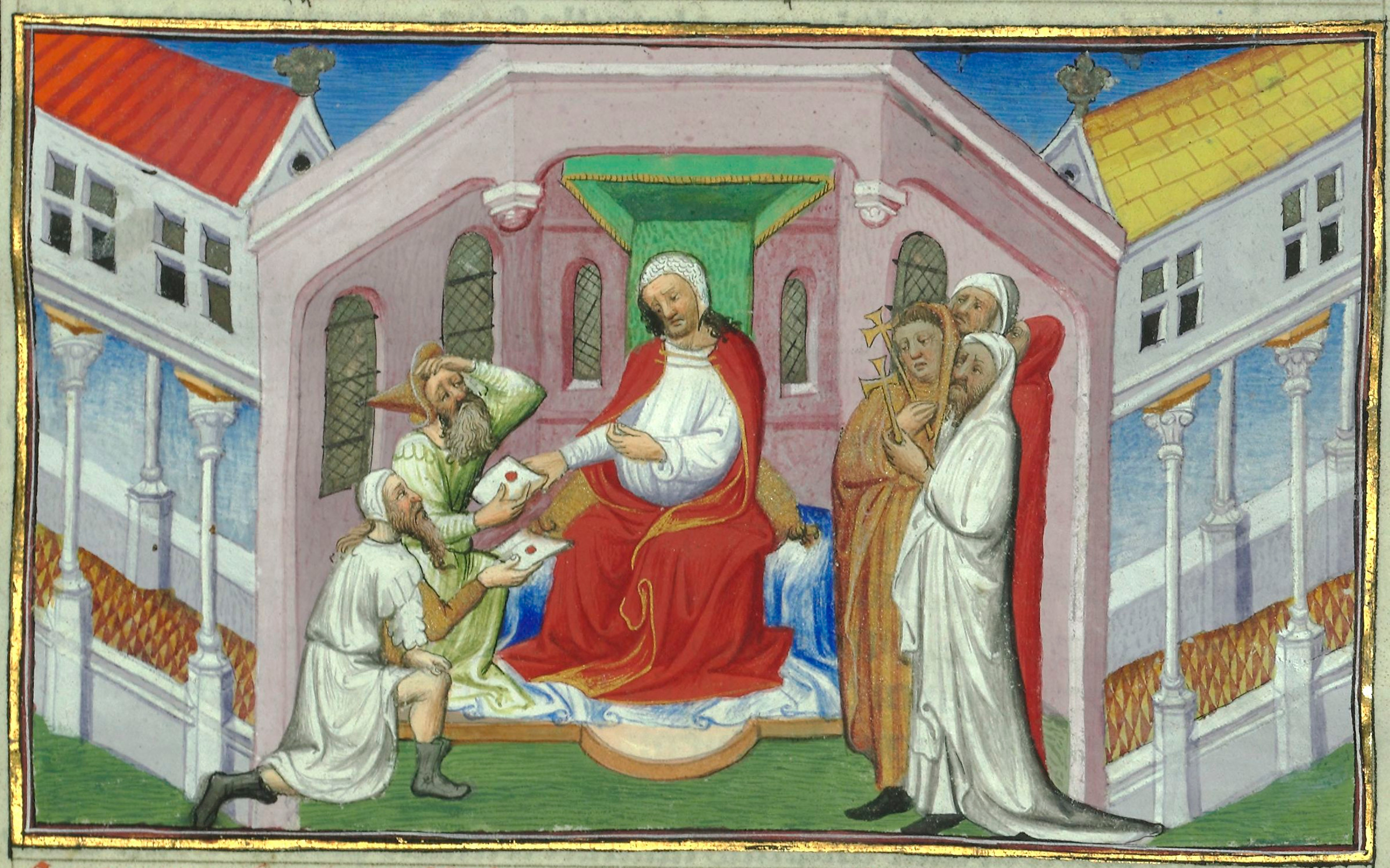
Depiction of the Keraite ruler "Wang Khan" ("King and Khan") Toghrul as "Prester John" in "Le Livre des Merveilles", 15th century.

An account of the conversion of the Keraite is given by the 13th century West Syrian historian, Gregory Bar Hebraeus, who documented a 1009 letter by Bishop Abdisho of Merv to the Patriarch John VI which announced the conversion of the Keraits to Christianity. According to Hebraeus, in the early 11th century, a Keraite king lost his way while hunting in the high mountains. When he had abandoned all hope, a saint, Mar Sergius, appeared in a vision and said, "If you will believe in Christ, I will lead you lest you perish." The king returned home safely, and when he later met Christian merchants, he remembered the vision and asked them about their faith. At their suggestion, he sent a message to the Metropolitan of Merv for priests and deacons to baptize him and his tribe. As a result of the mission that followed, the king and 20,000 of his people were baptized.

The legend of Prester John was also connected with the Nestorian rulers of the Keraite. Though the identity of Prester John was linked with individuals from other areas as well, such as India or Ethiopia, in some versions of the legend, Prester John was explicitly identified with the Christian Mongol Toghrul.

== Relations with Christian nations ==
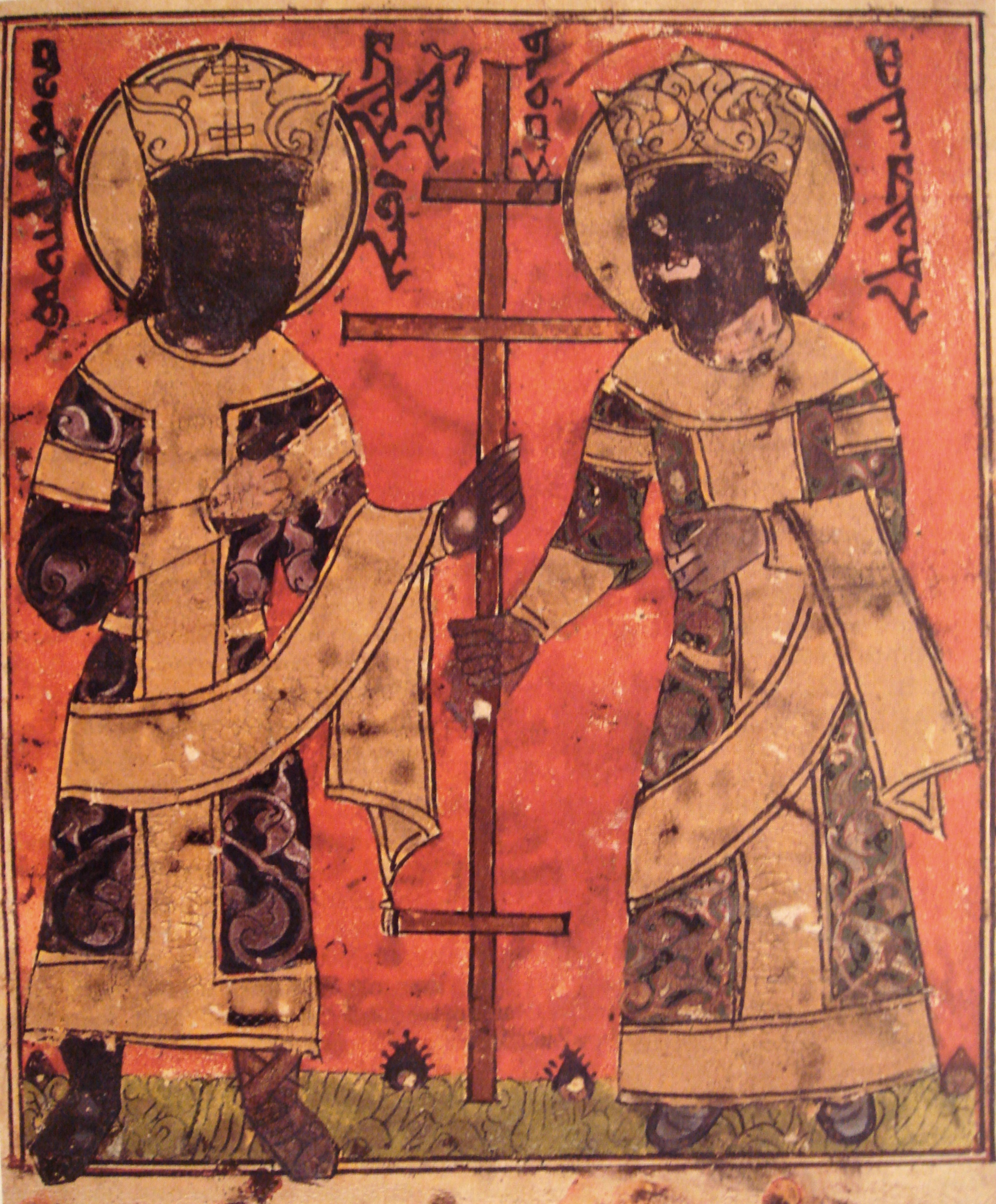
Hulagu and his wife Doquz Khatun in a Syriac Bible, 13th century

Some military collaboration with Christian powers took place from 1259–1260. Hetoum I of Cilician Armenia and his son-in-law Bohemond VI of Antioch had submitted to the Mongols, and, as did other vassal states, provided troops in the Mongols' expansion. The founder and leader of the Ilkhanate in 1260, Hulagu, was generally favourable to Christianity: his mother was Christian, his principal wife Doquz Khatun was a prominent Christian leader in the Ilkhanate, and at least one of his key generals, Kitbuqa, was also Christian. A later descendant of Hulagu, the Ilkhan Arghun, sent the Nestorian monk Rabban Bar Sauma as an ambassador to Western courts to offer an alliance between the Mongols and the Europeans. While there, Bar Sauma explained the situation of the Nestorian faith to the European monarchs:

"Know ye, O our Fathers, that many of our Fathers (Nestorian missionaries since the 7th century) have gone into the countries of the Mongols, and Turks, and Chinese and have taught them the Gospel, and at the present time there are many Mongols who are Christians. For many of the sons of the Mongol kings and queens have been baptized and confess Christ. And they have established churches in their military camps, and they pay honour to the Christians, and there are among them many who are believers."

— Travels of Rabban Bar Sauma

Upon his return, Bar Sauma wrote an elaborate account of his journey, which is of keen interest to modern historians, as it was the first account of Europe as seen through Eastern eyes.

== Influence of Catholic Christianity ==
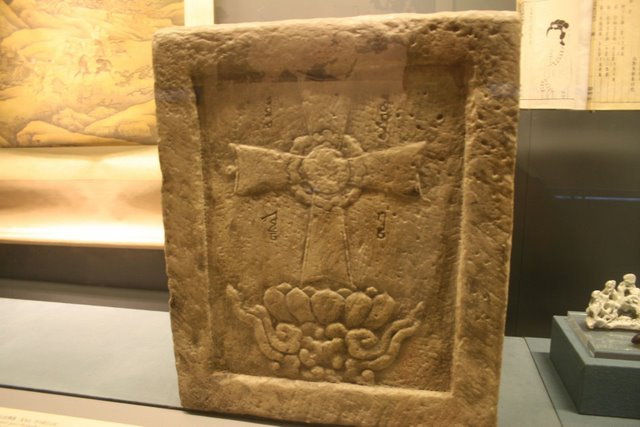
Chinese stone inscription of a Nestorian Christian Cross from Cross Temple, Fangshan in Beijing (then called Dadu, or Khanbaliq), Yuan dynasty

The type of Christianity which the Mongols practiced was an Eastern Syriac form, which had an independent hierarchy from Western doctrine since the Nestorian Schism in the 5th century. Over the centuries, much of Europe had become unaware that there were any Christians in central Asia and beyond, except for vague legends of a Prester John, a Christian king from the East who many hoped would come to help with the Crusades and the fight for the Holy Land. Even after contacts were re-established, there were still Western missionaries who proceeded eastward, to try and convert the Mongols to Roman Catholicism, away from what was regarded as heretical Nestorianism. Some contacts were with the capital of the Mongols, first in Karakorum and then Khanbaliq (Beijing) in Mongol-conquered China. A larger number of contacts were with the closest of the Mongol states, the Ilkhanate in what today is Iran, Iraq, and Syria.

As early as 1223, Franciscan missionaries had been traveling eastward to visit the prince of Damascus and the Caliph of Baghdad. In 1240, nine Dominicans led by Guichard of Cremone are known to have arrived in Tiflis, the capital of Christian Georgia, by the orders of Pope Gregory IX. Georgia submitted to the advancing Mongols in 1243, so as the missionaries lived for five years in the Georgian realm, much of it was in contact or in close proximity with the Mongols. In 1245, Pope Innocent IV sent a series of four missions to the Mongols. The first was led by the Dominican André de Longjumeau, who had already been sent to Constantinople once by Saint Louis to acquire the Crown of thorns from Baldwin II. His travels are known by the reports of Matthew Paris. Three other missions were sent between March and April 1245, led respectively by the Dominican Ascelin of Cremone (accompanied by Simon de Saint-Quentin, who later wrote the account of the mission in Historia Tartarorum), the Franciscan Lawrence of Portugal, and another Franciscan, John of Plano Carpini.

In 1253, the Franciscan William of Rubruck traveled to Karakorum, the western Mongol capital, and sought permission to serve its people in the name of Christ. He was received courteously, but forbidden to engage in missionary work or remain in the country. At one point of his stay among the Mongols, William did enter into a famous competition at the Mongol court. The khan encouraged a formal debate between the Christians, Buddhists, and Muslims, to determine which faith was correct, as determined by three judges, one from each faith. When William returned to the West, he wrote a 40-chapter document on the customs and geography of the Mongols. Armenian King Hethum I, Giovanni da Pian del Carpine and William Rubruck visited Mongolia.

Dominican missionaries to the Ilkhanate included Ricoldo of Montecroce and Barthelemy of Bologna, who later became the bishop in the Ilkhanate capital of Maragha. By the year 1300, there were numerous Dominican and Franciscan convents in the Il-Khanate. About ten cities had such institutions, including Maragha, Tabriz, Sultaniye, Tifflis, and Erzurum. To help with coordination, the Pope established an archbishop in the new capital of Sultaniye in 1318 in the person of Francon de Pérouse, who was assisted by six bishops. His successor in 1330 was Jean de Cor.

In 1302, the Nestorian Catholicos Mar Yaballaha III, who as a young man had accompanied the older Rabban Bar Sauma from Khanbaliq (Beijing), sent a profession of faith to the Pope. He thereby formalized his conversion to Roman Catholicism, though a 1304 letter from him to the pope indicated that his move had been strongly opposed by the local Nestorian clergy.

Mongol-European contacts diminished as Mongol power waned in Persia. In 1295, Ghazan (great-grandson of Hulagu) formally adopted Islam when he took the throne of the Ilkhanate in 1295, as did Berke along with other Golden Horde leaders.

In his own letters to the Mongol ruler in 1321 and 1322, the Pope still expressed his hope that the Mongol ruler would convert to Christianity. Between 500 and 1000 converts in each city were numbered by Jean of Sultaniye.

By the 14th century, the Mongols had effectively disappeared as a political power.

=== Catholic missions to Mongol China ===
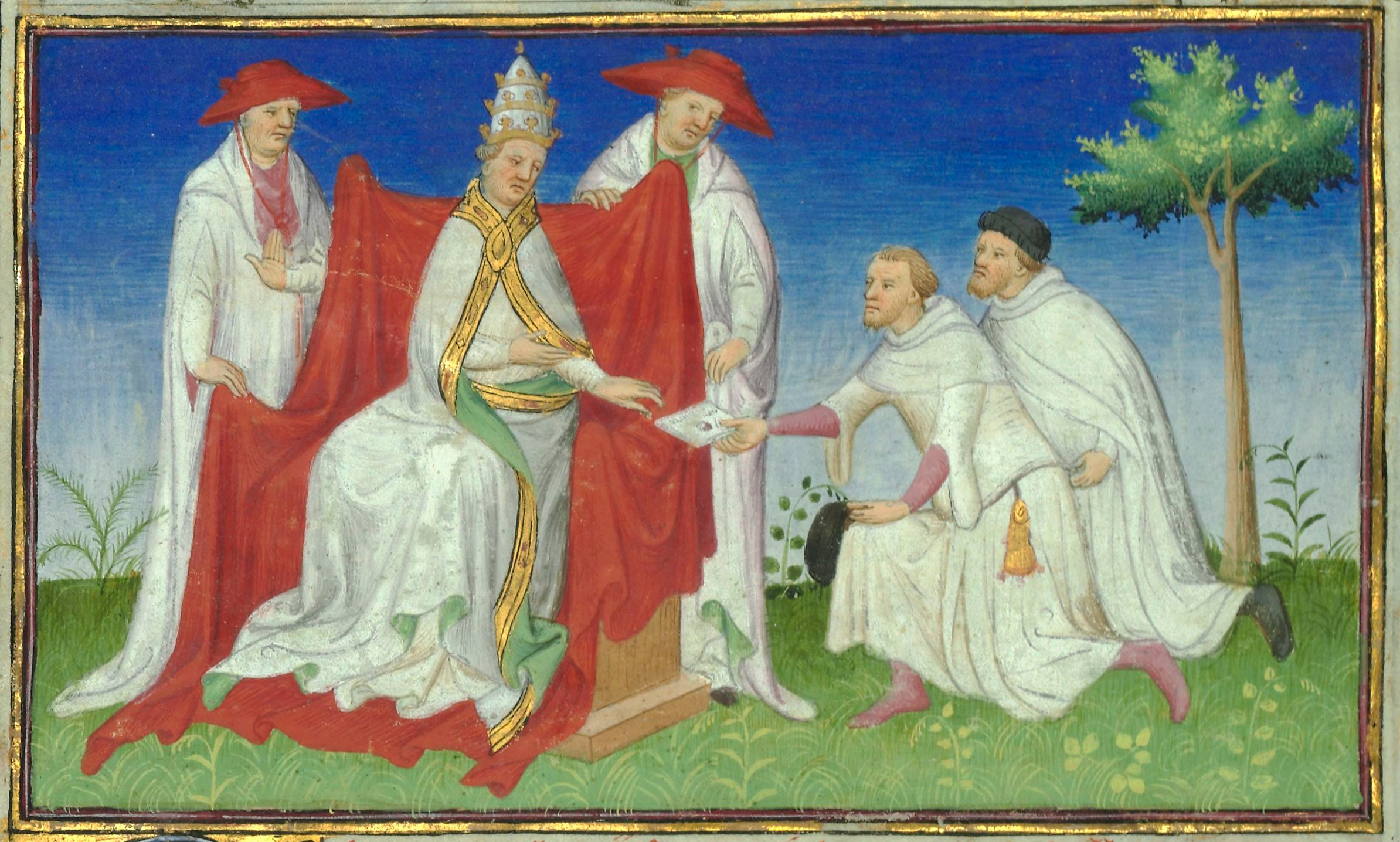
Niccolo and Maffeo Polo remitting a letter from Kublai Khan to Pope Gregory X in 1271

In 1271, the Polo brothers brought an invitation from Kublai Khan to Pope Gregory X, imploring him that a hundred teachers of science and religion be sent to reinforce the Christianity already present in his vast empire. This came to naught due to the hostility of influential Nestorians within the Mongol court, who objected to the introduction of the Western (Roman Catholic) form of Christianity to supplant their own Nestorian doctrine.

In 1289, Pope Nicholas IV sent the Franciscan John of Monte Corvino, who became China's first Roman Catholic missionary. He was significantly successful, translated the New Testament and Psalms into the Mongol language, built a central church, and within a few years (by 1305) could report six thousand baptized converts. But the work was not easy. He was often opposed by the Nestorians, whose style of Eastern Christianity was different from John's Western version. But the Franciscan mission continued to grow, other priests joined him and centers were established in the coastal provinces of Jiangsu (Yangzhou), Zhejiang (Hangzhou) and Fujian (Zaitun). Following the death of Monte Corvino, an embassy to the French Pope Benedict XII in Avignon was sent by Toghun Temür, the last Mongol emperor in the Yuan dynasty of China, in 1336. The Mongol ruler requested a new spiritual guide to replace Monte Corvino, so in 1338, a total of 50 ecclesiastics were sent by the Pope to Beijing, among them John of Marignolli.

Two massive catastrophes hastened the extinction of this second wave of missionaries to China. First, the Black Death during the latter half of the fourteenth century in Europe so depleted Franciscan houses that they were unable to sustain the mission to China. Second, the Mongol-created Yuan dynasty in China began to decline. The native Chinese rose up and drove out the Mongols, thereby launching the Ming dynasty in 1368. By 1369, all Christians, whether Roman Catholic or Syro-Oriental, were expelled. With the end of Mongol rule in the 14th century, Christianity almost disappeared in mainland Asia, with three of the four principal Mongol khanates embracing Islam.

== See also ==
- Buddhism in Mongolia
- Christianity in Asia
- Islam in Mongolia
- Religion in the Mongol Empire

== References and further reading ==
- Grousset, René (2006). Histoire des Croisades III, 1188–1291 (in French). Editions Perrin. ISBN 978-2-262-02569-4.
- Calmard, Jean (1996–2021). "Franco-Persian relations". In Yarshater, Ehsan (ed.). Encyclopædia Iranica (Online ed.). Encyclopædia Iranica Foundation. Archived from the original on 2007-09-27.
- Budge, E. A. Wallis (1928). The monks of Kublai Khan, emperor of China. Also available from nestorian.org.
- Foltz, Richard (2010). Religions of the Silk Road: Premodern patterns of globalization. New York: Palgrave Macmillan. ISBN 978-0-230-62125-1.
- Roux, Jean-Paul (1993). Histoire de l'Empire Mongol (in French). Fayard. ISBN 2-213-03164-9.
- Weatherford, Jack (2004). Genghis Khan and the Making of the Modern World. Three Rivers Press. ISBN 0-609-80964-4.
- Luisetto, Frédéric (2007). Arméniens et autres Chrétiens d'Orient sous la domination Mongole (in French). Geuthner. ISBN 978-2-7053-3791-9.
- Mahé, Annie; Mahé, Jean-Pierre (2005). L'Arménie à l'épreuve des siècles. Coll. “Découvertes Gallimard” (in French). Vol. 464. Paris: Éditions Gallimard. ISBN 978-2-07-031409-6.
- Runciman, Steven (1954). The Kingdom of Acre and the later crusades. A history of the crusades. Vol. 3. University Press.
- Rossabi, Morris (1992). Voyager from Xanadu: Rabban Sauma and the first journey from China to the West. Kodansha International Ltd. ISBN 4-7700-1650-6.
- Roux, Jean-Paul; Roux, Sylvie-Anne (5 February 1985). Les explorateurs au Moyen Âge [Explorers in the Middle Ages] (in French) (New ed.). Paris: Fayard. ISBN 978-2-213-01591-0. OCLC 12591151.
