= Alaqush =

Alaqush Tegin Quri

King of Onguds
- Reign: ? – 1211
- Predecessor: Unknown
- Successor: Zhenguo
- Died: 1211
- Spouse: Alakhai Bekhi
Posthumous name
- Chinese: 忠武, romanized: Zhōngwǔ, lit. 'Loyal and Martial'
- Religion: Nestorian

Alaqush Tegin Quri or Alaqush Digit Quri (Persian: اولاقوش تیکین قوری, romanized: Alāqūsh Tīkīn Qūrī, Chinese: 阿剌兀思剔吉忽里; pinyin: Āláwùsī Tījí Hūlǐ, died 1211) was a tribal leader of Onguds and a contemporary of Genghis Khan.

== Biography ==
He was Nestorian ruler of Turkic ancestry who is first remembered by sources when he was approached by the Nayman prince Tayang Khan in 1203, who shared the same cultural and religious background with him. While the Naimans were negotiating for a possible alliance against Temujin, Alaqush secretly sent a messenger named Johannan to him, informing them of brewing troubles. Tayang Khan soon was killed in 1204 and Alaqush Tegin formed an alliance with Genghis, pledging loyalty to him and receiving the hand of Genghis' daughter Alakhai Bekhi for his son Buyan Shiban in return in 1207.

During the Mongol invasion of Northern China, Alaqush assisted Genghis Khan by handing over the passage through the Great Wall of China that he was guarding during his service to the Jin Dynasty. However, later Öngüds revolted against Genghis Khan in 1211 and killed both Alaqush and his son. Having suppressed the uprising eventually, Genghis Khan intended to execute all Ongud men taller than the cart axle, but was dissuaded by Alaqush's nephew Shigü (or Zhenguo in Chinese rendering) and Alakhai, thus, only the instigators of the murder were executed along with their families. Alakhai subsequently married Shigü.

Alaqush was posthumously awarded the title King of Gaotang (高唐王) by Emperor Chengzong of Yuan in 1305.

== Family ==
Descendants of Alaqush continued to intermarry with the Borjigin family and retained special status within the empire for generations:

- Buyan Shiban (d. 1211) - married Alakhai Bekhi
- Boyaohe - m. Alakhai in 1225 in levirate marriage
  - Kün Buqa (君不花), Prince Zhongxiang - m. Yelmish Khatun (叶里迷失), daughter of Güyük Khan; died during Mongol invasion of Song
    - Nanqiadai, Prince Zhonglie (忠烈王) - m. Princess Yilianzhen of Borjigin
    - Kölinček, Prince Zhao Kangxi - m. Princess Uyghur (Huihe, 回鹘公主), granddaughter of Büri
    - Antong
  - Ay Buqa (愛不花) - m. Grand Princess of Zhao, Yuelie (赵国大長公主), daughter of Kublai Khan
    - George (Körgis, 闊里吉思), Prince of Gaotang - m. Senior Princess of Qi, Qutadmish, daughter of Zhenjin, later Princess Zhao, daughter of Temür Khan; d. 1298
      - John (Shùān, 朮安) - m. Aratnabala, daughter of Gammala (1263-1302), son of Zhenjin
    - Esen Qaymish (died young)
    - Johannan (Shùhūnán, 朮忽難), Prince of Gaotang - 1st m. Princess Yemian'ganzhen, daughter of Prince Qurudai (grandson of Khülgen, 6th son of Genghis Khan), 2nd m. Princess Ashituluhu, daughter of Naila Buqa (grandson of Darmabala)
    - Aribadai - m. Princess Nulun, daughter of Prince Wangze of Wei, great-grandson of Möngke Khan
    - Princess Bizhaxia - m. Gammala
    - Princess Yeliwan - m. Altan Buqa, son of Manggala
    - Princess Qutluq - m. Ebügen, son of Qurudai
  - Yer Buqa (拙里不花) - Governor of Yunnan
    - Constance (Quštanz, 火思丹) - married to Prince Zhuhuzhen, son of Prince Buluochu (Ögedei's great-grandson)
