= Ongud =

Turkic tribe

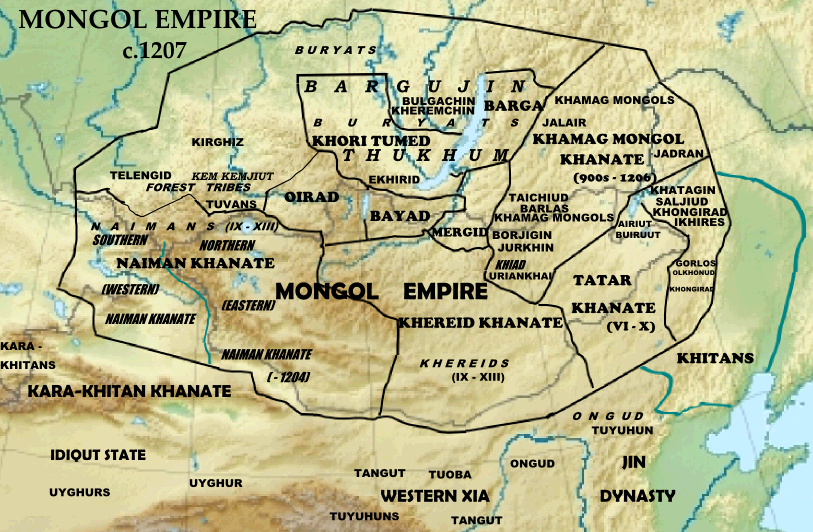
Mongol Empire c.1207, Ongud and their neighbours

The Ongud (also spelled Ongut or Öngüt and Önggüt or Onggut; Mongolian: Онгуд, Онход; Chinese: 汪古, Wanggu; from Old Turkic öng "desolate, uninhabited; desert" plus güt "class marker") were a Turkic tribe that later became part of various Turkic and Mongolic peoples. They were active in what is now Inner Mongolia in northern China around the time of Genghis Khan (1162–1227). Many Ongud were members of the Church of the East. They lived in an area lining the Great Wall in the northern part of the Ordos Plateau and territories to the northeast of it. They appear to have had two capitals, a northern one at the ruin known as Olon Süme and another a bit to the south at a place called Koshang or Dongsheng. They acted as wardens of the marches for the Jin dynasty (1115–1234) to the north of Shanxi.

== History ==
=== Origin ===
The ancestors of the Ongud were the Shatuo Turks, who, in turn, descended mainly from the two remnant tribes of Western Turkic Khaganate: namely, the Chuyue, the Türgesh-associated Suoge, and the Anqing of Sogdian origins. In the seventh century they moved to east of modern Dzungaria, then under the rule of the Tang dynasty. By the ninth century, the Shatuo were scattered over north Shanxi and modern Inner Mongolia. In 808, 30,000 Shatuo under Zhuye Jinzhong defected from the Tibetans to Tang China and the Tibetans punished them by killing Zhuye Jinzhong as they were chasing them. The Uyghurs also fought against an alliance of Shatuo and Tibetans at Beshbalik. The Shatuo Turks under Zhuye Chixin (Li Guochang) served the Tang dynasty in fighting against their fellow Turkic people in the Uyghur Khaganate. In 839, when the Uyghur khaganate (Huihu) general Jueluowu (掘羅勿) rose against the rule of then-reigning Zhangxin Khan, he elicited the help from Zhuye Chixin by giving Zhuye 300 horses, and together, they defeated Zhangxin Khan, who then committed suicide, precipitating the subsequent collapse of the Uyghur Khaganate. In the next few years, when Uyghur Khaganate remnants tried to raid Tang borders, the Shatuo participated extensively in counterattacking the Uyghur Khaganate with other tribes loyal to Tang. In 843, Zhuye Chixin, under the command of the Han Chinese officer Shi Xiong with Tuyuhun, Tangut and Han Chinese troops, participated in a raid against the Uyghur khaganate that led to the slaughter of Uyghur forces at Shahu mountain. A Shatuo warlord, Li Keyong, mobilized 10,000 Shatuo cavalrymen and served the Tang dynasty as an ally. In 923, his son Li Cunxu defeated the Later Liang dynasty and became emperor of the Later Tang dynasty.

After the overthrow of the Li family, Shatuo commanders established the Later Jin, the Later Han and the Northern Han.

=== Mongol Empire ===
In the 13th century, a part of Shatuo probably included in the Mongol Empire as an Ongud tribe, another part as White Tatars. According to a number of authors, the Onguds were already a Mongolized tribe in the 13th century (Nikolai Aristov, Ochir). Academicians Boris Vladimirtsov and Vasily Bartold believed that ethnically the Onguds were already the southern Mongols. According to the Mongolian chronicler Sanan-Setsen, the Onguds at the time of Genghis Khan were part of the Su Mongols.

The Ongud chief Ala Kush Tegin revealed the Naimans plan to attack Genghis Khan in 1205 and allied with the Mongols. When Genghis Khan invaded the Jin Dynasty in 1211, Ala Kush Tegin supported him. Genghis married his daughter Alakhai Bekhi to one of Ala Kush's sons. However, political opponents killed Ala Kush Tegin. Genghis put down the rebellion and took the family under his protection, with his daughter the de facto ruler. Alakhai Bekhi ruled the Ongud as regent for several underage princes until the reign of Güyük Khan (1246–48).

Many famous post-Genghis Mongols are of Ongud descent, including the well-known traveler, diplomat, and monk of the Church of the East, Rabban Bar Sauma (1220–1294). The Ongud proved good allies to Kublai. For example, the Ongud ruler George was the son of Princess Yuelie, daughter of Kublai and married Kublai's two granddaughters and fought against Kaidu, whose protégé Duwa captured and killed him later in 1298. A number of Öngüd, including George, were said to have been converted to Catholicism by John of Montecorvino (1246–1328).

After 1221 many Onguds were resettled in Khwarezm, where they served as governors for the Golden Horde. They formed part of the Argyns and the Mughal tribe. The Onguds in Mongolia became an otog of the Tumed in the 15th century. The Onguds gradually vanished from historical records and likely assimilated into other Turkic and Mongol tribes beginning in the post-Yuan period. The Mongols of Inner Mongolia, Mongolia and western China eventually converted to Tibetan Buddhism from the 16th century onwards.

== Art and architecture ==
The University of Hong Kong possesses a collection of around a thousand 13th- and 14th-century bronze Nestorian crosses from the Ongud region collected during the 1920s by F. A. Nixon, a British postal official working in northern China. Although their designs vary, the East Syriac cross resembling the Maltese crosses with a square central panel displaying a swastika, the Buddhist good luck symbol, predominate.

The Ongud Monument Ensemble was constructed by the Turkic tribes during the 6th-8th centuries for their noblemen. This consists of over 30 man-like figures, a lion and a sheep, and about 550 standing stones in alignments reminiscent of Carnac or Avebury. There is also a large tomb made of 4 sculptured slabs. Each slab has the front face decorated with a trellis-pattern like the walls of a yurt, and a simple frieze on top.

== See also ==
- List of medieval Mongol tribes and clans
- Christianity among the Mongols
