= Olon Süme =

Coordinates: 41°57′36″N 110°29′10″E

Olon Süme (or Olon Süme-yin Tor) is an archaeological site in northern Darhan Muminggan United Banner of Baotou prefecture level city, Inner Mongolia, China. Since the 1930s the site has been identified as a possible northern capital of the medieval Ongut kings. A collection of small artefacts from the site was exhibited and published in Japan in 2003. More recently the Chinese government has begun developing the site as a tourist destination.
