= List of haplogroups of historic people =

This is a list of haplogroups of historic people. Haplogroups can be determined from the skeletal or tissue remains of historical figures (ancient DNA), or inferred from genealogical DNA tests of living people who trace their direct maternal or paternal ancestry to a noted historical figure. Some contemporary notable figures have also made their test results public in news programs or documentaries.

MtDNA results indicate direct maternal descent, whereas Y-DNA results indicate direct paternal descent; these represent only two of many lines of ancestry. Inferences drawn from living descendants remain hypotheses that can be revised or disproved by future research or undocumented non-paternity events.

== Y-chromosome DNA (Y-DNA) haplogroups ==
=== Haplogroup C ===
==== Emperor Wu of Northern Zhou ====
An ancient DNA study of Emperor Wu of Northern Zhou identified him as male and assigned his Y chromosome to haplogroup C2a1a1b1a-F3830+, refined by hybridization capture data to downstream subclade C2a1a1b1a2a1-FGC28857 × (FGC28846, Z44095, FGC31362, Z45818). His mtDNA haplogroup was determined as C4a1a + 195. Both his paternal and maternal lineages trace to Northeast Asia, where they remain present at moderate frequencies.

==== Genghis Khan ====
Several researchers have proposed candidates for the Y-chromosomal haplogroup (and patrilineal ancestry) of Genghis Khan, including haplogroup C3, haplogroup Q, haplogroup R1b, and haplogroup C2.

Y-chromosome haplogroup C2c1a1a1-M407 is carried by Mongol descendants of the Northern Yuan ruler Dayan Khan (r. 1474–1517), a male-line descendant of Genghis Khan. This differs from the widespread C2b1a3a1c2-F5481 clade of the C2*-ST ("Star Cluster") found across Central Asia among Kazakhs, Hazaras, and commoner Mongols, which traces to ordinary Mongol soldiers rather than Genghis Khan himself. The Kerey clan of the Kazakhs also has a high frequency of the C3* star-cluster (C2*-ST) Y chromosome.

Claimed descendants of Toghan (Genghis Khan's sixth son) carry Y haplogroup C2b1a1b1-F1756, matching descendants of Genghis Khan's eldest son Jochi in the Kazakh Tore clan. Studies led by M. V. Derenko (2007) of self-identified descendants indicated that Genghis Khan may have belonged to a subclade of Haplogroup C-M217 (C2) such as C-F4002 (C2b1a3). A 2019 study likewise proposed haplogroup C2b1a1b1 (C2) via Jochi's line as a candidate for Genghis Khan's Y-DNA lineage. Conversely, a 2016 study analyzing DNA from a Borjigin burial site in Mongolia suggested that Genghis Khan may have belonged to the West Eurasian haplogroup R-M343 (R1b), with the East Asian appearance of the remains attributed to their East Eurasian mitochondrial DNA haplogroups.

==== Nurhaci ====
Y-DNA haplogroup C3b2b1* (C-M401*, (xF5483)) has been identified as a possible marker of the Aisin Gioro clan (founders of the Qing dynasty under Nurhaci). It is found in ten ethnic minorities in northern China, but is relatively rare in Han Chinese.

==== Amir Timur ====
According to FamilyTreeDNA, claimed descendants of Timur show a wide variety of Y-DNA haplogroups. The majority of Timurid–Mughal claimants from India belong to C-M217, whereas claimants from Uzbekistan and Pakistan mostly report R1a and J-M172.

=== Haplogroup D ===
==== Viscount Fukuoka Takachika ====
Viscount Fukuoka Takachika (福岡 孝弟; 5 February 1835 – 7 March 1919), a Meiji period statesman known for drafting the Five-Article Charter Oath, has been assigned to Y-DNA haplogroup D1a2a2a1c (D-FT413039, subclade FTJ51902) based on DNA testing of his direct great-great-grandson, Fukuoka Takashige. This haplogroup also matches Jōmon skeletal remains excavated from the Iei Site in Naganohara, Gunma, dating to the early Jōmon period (approx. 11,300 to 7,200 years ago).

==== Asano Sōichirō ====
Asano Sōichirō (浅野 総一郎; 13 April 1848 – 9 November 1930), a Japanese businessman who founded Sapporo Breweries, Toa Construction Corporation, Oki Electric Industry, JFE Group, and Taiheiyo Cement (formerly Asano Cement), belonged to Y-DNA haplogroup D1a2a1a2b1a1a8a (D-CTS4093).

=== Haplogroup E ===
==== Ramesses III ====
In December 2012, an ancient DNA study of Ramesses III, second pharaoh of the Twentieth Dynasty of Egypt, used an STR predictor to assign him to Y-DNA haplogroup E-M2 (also known as E1b1a).

==== Albert Einstein ====
Albert Einstein has been linked to Y-DNA haplogroup E. Tested Einsteins from Germany belong to E1b1b1b2* (cluster SNP PF1952, formerly known as E-Z830-B or the "Jewish cluster"). A patrilineal descendant of Albert Einstein's great-grandfather Naphtali Hirsch Einstein (1733–1799) was tested and belonged to E-M35 (E1b1b1).

==== Adolf Hitler ====
In 2010, journalist Jean-Paul Mulders and historian Marc Vermeeren publicised an analysis of samples from 39 patrilineal relatives of Adolf Hitler, reporting that Hitler belonged to Y-DNA haplogroup E1b1b, with the subclade undisclosed.

Mulders rejected media claims that his findings implied Jewish ancestry, commenting:

I never wrote that Hitler was a Jew, or that he had a Jewish grandfather. I only wrote that Hitler's haplogroup is E1b1b. All the rest are speculations of journalists who didn't even take the trouble to read my article, although I had it translated into English especially for this purpose.

Professor Michael Hammer of Family Tree DNA likewise cautioned against such media interpretations, noting that at most 9% of the German and Austrian population carries E1b1b and roughly 80% of those carriers are not Jewish. In 2019, Leonard Sax also criticized the study's sampling ethics, writing:

Such methods – obtaining material without the consent of the donor – would generally disqualify the study from publication in a reputable journal.

==== Napoleon ====
Analysis of two beard hairs attributed to Napoleon Bonaparte assigned him to Y-DNA haplogroup E1b1b1c1* (E-M34*).

==== Hunyadi family ====
In 2021, researchers from the Institute of Hungarian Research collected bone samples from the remains of John Corvinus and Christopher Corvinus in the Church of the Blessed Virgin Mary in Lepoglava to establish the genetic profile of the Hunyadi family for potential comparison with remains at Székesfehérvár attributed to King Matthias Corvinus. Published in Heliyon in 2022, the study sequenced the last two male members of the family.

John and Christopher Corvinus both carried Y-DNA haplogroup E1b1b1a1b1a6a1c~ (E-BY4281), within the E-V13 clade of E-M78, confirming their father–son relationship. Their closest ancient Y-DNA matches were a sample from the Iron Age Otrar–Karatau culture of the Kazakh steppe and a medieval sample from Sardinia, while their closest autosomal matches from the Carpathian Basin came from Avar individuals, elite Hungarian Conquerors, and a medieval Hungarian nobleman from the Royal Basilica.

On the maternal side, John Corvinus belonged to mtDNA haplogroup T2b, and Christopher Corvinus belonged to the rare mtDNA haplogroup T2c1+146, consistent with the known origins of their mothers. Their overall autosomal genomes showed predominantly ancient European ancestry (50% Neolithic Anatolian, 31% Ancient North Eurasian, 8% Iranian Neolithic, 5% Western Hunter-Gatherer, 3% Early Bronze Age, and 2% Han), clustering with modern populations of southern Europe and the Carpathian Basin.

=== Haplogroup G ===
==== Ötzi the Iceman ====
Ancient DNA sequencing of Ötzi (the 5,300-year-old Tyrolean Iceman) placed his Y chromosome in a subclade of G defined by SNPs M201, P287, P15, L223, and L91 (G-L91, ISOGG G2a2b). Further analysis of his BAM file assigned him to subclades L166 and FGC5672 below L91. G-L91 is today most common in southern Corsica. In 2013, researchers at Innsbruck Medical University tested over 3,700 Tyrolean male blood donors and found 19 (approx. 0.5%) who shared Ötzi's Y-DNA haplogroup G-L91.

Ötzi's mtDNA belonged to a previously unknown K1 clade (distinct from modern K1a, K1b, and K1c) provisionally named K1ö.

==== Yuya ====
Yuya, a maternal great-grandfather of Tutankhamun and key adviser to Amenhotep III from Akhmin, was predicted from ancient Y-STR profiles to belong to Y-DNA haplogroup G2a.

==== Richard III of England ====
The skeletal remains of King Richard III of England (last monarch of the House of York and the House of Plantagenet) were assigned to Y-DNA G-P287, differing from the Y haplotypes of putative modern patrilineal relatives.

His mtDNA belonged to haplogroup J1c2c, matching two living direct maternal-line descendants of his sister Anne of York, Duchess of Exeter: Michael Ibsen (son of Joy Ibsen, traced by historian John Ashdown-Hill in 2004) and Wendy Duldig. Richard's maternal line traces to Paon de Roet of Hainaut, whose daughter Philippa Roet married Geoffrey Chaucer.

==== Bure kinship ====
The male lineage of the medieval Bure kinship from Sweden has been identified as Y-DNA haplogroup G2a through Big Y testing of living descendants in 2014. Descendants of two sons of Old Olof (born c. 1380) belonged to G-Y12970*, and descendants of his alleged brother Fale belonged to G-Y16788. The results corroborated genealogical records compiled c. 1610 by Johannes Bureus while disproving a later added branch.

=== Haplogroup I ===
==== Birger Magnusson ====
Birger Jarl (Birger Magnusson), founder of Stockholm and paternal ancestor of kings of Sweden and Norway beginning with his son Valdemar, King of Sweden, belonged to Y-DNA Haplogroup I-M253, according to Andreas Carlsson at the National Board of Forensic Medicine of Sweden.

==== Alexander Hamilton ====
Alexander Hamilton, one of the Founding Fathers of the United States, belonged to Y-DNA I1a based on testing of descendants.

==== Emanuel Swedenborg ====
The 18th-century Swedish scientist and mystic Emanuel Swedenborg (1688–1772) likely belonged to Y-DNA haplogroup I1-BY229, a lineage whose most recent common ancestor lived about 1,500 years ago in central Scandinavia.

==== Gleb Svyatoslavich ====
A 2020 ancient DNA study in Nature showed that Gleb Svyatoslavich (sample VK542), an 11th-century Rurikid Prince of Tmutarakan and Novgorod in Kievan Rus', belonged to Y-DNA haplogroup I2a1a2b1a1a (I-Y3120) and mtDNA haplogroup H5a2a. On YFull's YTree, his Y-DNA is placed under I-Y3120 > Y4460 > Y3106 > Y91535.

==== Martin Luther ====
Tested relatives of Protestant reformer Martin Luther belonged to Haplogroup I2a-Din-N (L147.2+).

=== Haplogroup J ===
==== Fath-Ali Shah Qajar ====
Testing of descendants of several sons of Fath-Ali Shah Qajar (1772–1834), second emperor of the Qajar dynasty of Iran, placed him in Y-DNA Haplogroup J-M267 with DYS388 = 13.

==== Rothschild family ====
Patrilineal members of the Jewish Rothschild family belong to Y-DNA haplogroup J2a1-L210, based on surname project testing. Haplogroup J2 is widespread across Asia Minor, Persia, Central Asia, the Caucasus Mountains, the Levant, and the Fertile Crescent, including among Jews and in Lebanon, and subclade J2a has also been recovered from West Eurasian remains in the Altai Mountains.

=== Haplogroup O ===
==== Cao Cao ====
Testing of documented living descendants of the Chinese warlord Cao Cao (posthumously Emperor Wu of Cao Wei), combined with ancient DNA analysis of a tooth from his granduncle Cao Ding, placed Cao Cao in Y-DNA haplogroup O-M175 (specifically O2-M268). A follow-up study refined his haplogroup to O1b1-F1462(xPK4).

==== Gia Long ====
Gia Long, first emperor of Vietnam's Nguyễn dynasty, may have belonged to Y-DNA haplogroup O-M95 based on testing of a single documented descendant. Because of the single-sample size, further testing of documented descendants is needed to confirm this assignment.

=== Haplogroup Q ===
==== Gaodang King Korguz (George) ====
Ancient DNA from three Mongol noble burials of the Yuan dynasty at the Shuzhuanglou site in northernmost Hebei, China (c. 700 years BP), placed all three men in Y-DNA haplogroup Q (subclade unanalyzed). The principal occupant, Ongud King George (Korguz, Chinese: 高唐王闊裏吉思), carried mtDNA haplogroup D4m2, while the other two individuals carried mtDNA haplogroup A. Korguz was king of the Ongud, son of a daughter of Kublai Khan, and married to two Yuan princesses.

=== Haplogroup R1a ===
==== Árpád dynasty ====
Y-STR and Y-SNP archaeogenetic studies of the remains of King Béla III of Hungary and an unidentified male Árpád relative ("II/52" / "HU52") from the Royal Basilica of Székesfehérvár assigned the Árpád dynasty patriline to the rare R1a subclade R1a-SUR51. Together with an individual from Serbia, the medieval Árpád samples share private SNPs defining the novel subclade R1a-SUR51 > R-ARP, from which the Serbian line branches as R-ARP > R-UVD.

==== Somerled ====
In 2003 and 2005, Oxford University geneticist Bryan Sykes tested patrilineal descendants of Clan Donald and concluded that the Scottish Gaelic–Norse leader Somerled of Argyll belonged to Y-DNA haplogroup R1a1, matching a Norse lineage. In 2024, Peter Biggins, administrator of the Clan Colla Project at Family Tree DNA, argued that the R1a1 chiefs of Clan Donald descend from Angus Og, whereas descendants of his older brother Alasdair Og carry the R1b subclade R-Z3008.

==== Nikola Tesla ====
Testing of relatives of the Serb scientist and inventor Nikola Tesla (1856–1943), published on the Serbian DNA Project at Poreklo, placed his Y-DNA patriline in haplogroup R1a-M458 (L1029 subclade).

=== Haplogroup R1b ===
==== Basal or undetermined R1b ====
===== Tutankhamun =====
Ancient DNA testing of the Eighteenth Dynasty pharaoh Tutankhamun was initially not published in the 2010 JAMA study of royal mummies. When the commercial genomics company iGENEA claimed from broadcast images that Tutankhamun belonged to Y-DNA haplogroup R1b1a2, members of the original research team disputed the claim as unscientific. However, in a 2020 publication, those same researchers confirmed that Tutankhamun's Y-DNA haplogroup was R1b.

===== Nicholas II of Russia and family =====
Ancient DNA from the remains of the last tsar of Russia, Nicholas II of Russia, has been predicted to belong to Y-DNA R1b.

On the maternal side, Nicholas II belonged to mtDNA haplogroup T (mutations 16126C, 16169Y, 16294T, 16296T, 73G, 263G, and 315.1C), matching his cousin Prince Nikolai Trubetskoy and showing a mitochondrial heteroplasmy shared with his exhumed brother Grand Duke George. Empress Alexandra of Russia and her children (Olga, Tatiana, Maria, Anastasia, and Alexei) belonged to mtDNA haplogroup H (16111T, 16357C, 263G, 315.1C), matching her grand-nephew Prince Philip, Duke of Edinburgh. Four further individuals from the burial (thought to be the Royal Physician and servants) also had their mtDNA typed.

See also #Genghis Khan under Haplogroup C for a 2016 study proposing R-M343 (R1b) from a Borjigin burial site.

==== R-L21 ====
===== Niall of the Nine Hostages =====
A study conducted at Trinity College, Dublin, found that a high proportion of men in Ireland and Scotland carry R1b1c7 (R-M222), a lineage historically linked in popular genealogy to the early Irish king Niall of the Nine Hostages. Later phylogenetic dating showed that R-M222 emerged more than 2,000 years ago, predating Niall and potentially reflecting an earlier ancestor such as Conn of the Hundred Battles.

===== Brian Boru =====
The Irish king Brian Boru, founder of the O'Brien dynasty, is associated via descendant testing with the Dalcassian haplogroup R1b-L226.

==== R-U106 ====
===== Louis XVI =====
Testing of three living male-line members of the House of Bourbon indicated that King Louis XVI belonged to Y-DNA haplogroup R-U106 (a subclade of R1b), contradicting an earlier analysis of a blood-stained handkerchief attributed to his execution that had suggested haplogroup G-M201.

==== R-S1194 ====
===== Adams political family =====
Y-STR and whole Y-chromosome sequencing of documented patrilineal descendants from five sons of Massachusetts colonist Henry Adams of Braintree (1583–1646, born in Barton St David, Somerset, England), including President John Adams's great-grandfather Joseph Adams Sr. (1626–1694), assigns the patriline of the Adams political family to R1b-S1194. All tested branches share the SNP path R-M269 > L23 > L51 > P310 > L151 > S1194 > CTS4528 (S1200) > S14328 > A8469 > S1196 > S6868 > FGC23894 (FGC23892) > FGC23887 > Z4471. Historical members on this patriline include:

- John Adams (1735–1826), Founding Father, 1st Vice President, and 2nd President of the United States;
- John Quincy Adams (1767–1848), 8th U.S. Secretary of State and 6th President of the United States (eldest son of John Adams);
- Samuel Adams (1722–1803), Founding Father and 4th Governor of Massachusetts (second cousin of John Adams);
- Charles Francis Adams Sr. (1807–1886), U.S. Minister to the United Kingdom (son of John Quincy Adams);
- Henry Adams (1838–1918), historian and author (son of Charles Francis Adams Sr.);
- Charles Francis Adams III (1866–1954), 44th U.S. Secretary of the Navy (great-grandson of John Quincy Adams).

===== Thomas Edison =====
The American inventor Thomas Edison (1847–1931) belonged on his paternal line to R-S1194 > R-CTS4528 > R-S14328 > R-A8469 > R-SZ5489 > R-Y28597 > R-S10242, based on Y-STR and Big Y testing of patrilineal descendants of his great-grandfather, the Dutch-American Loyalist colonist John Edison (c. 1727–1814), in the Edison Y-DNA Surname Project.

=== Haplogroup T ===
==== Thomas Jefferson ====
Direct male-line descendants of a cousin of U.S. president Thomas Jefferson were genotyped during investigations into whether Jefferson fathered children with Sally Hemings, and subsequently analyzed with an extended 17-marker haplotype in 2007 and Family Tree DNA's 12-marker panel. The Jefferson patriline belongs to haplogroup T (M184; formerly designated K2).

== Mitochondrial DNA (mtDNA) haplogroups ==
The entries below list historic individuals for whom only mtDNA has been determined; individuals with both Y-DNA and mtDNA results are listed under their Y-DNA haplogroup above.

=== Haplogroup A ===
==== Mummy Juanita ====
Ancient DNA testing of the Peruvian mummy "Juanita" (the "Ice Maiden") assigned her to mtDNA haplogroup A.

=== Haplogroup F ===
==== Empress Ashina of Göktürk ====
Ancient DNA from the remains of Empress Ashina of the Göktürk Khaganate confirmed her as female (with <1% modern mtDNA contamination) and assigned her to mtDNA haplogroup F1d, a lineage prevalent in Northeast Asia.

=== Haplogroup H ===
==== Jean-Paul Marat ====
A 2020 metagenomic ancient DNA study of a bloodstain from French Revolutionary Jean-Paul Marat (assassinated in 1793) assigned him to mtDNA haplogroup H2.

==== Luke the Evangelist ====
Remains reputed to be those of Luke the Evangelist (1st century AD) yielded mtDNA haplogroup H2.

==== Louis XVII ====
Louis XVII, younger son of King Louis XVI and Queen Marie Antoinette, carried mtDNA haplogroup H.

==== Queen Marie Antoinette ====
Queen Marie Antoinette belonged to mtDNA haplogroup H.

==== Sweyn II of Denmark ====
Ancient DNA extracted from teeth of King Sweyn II of Denmark in Roskilde Cathedral assigned him to mtDNA haplogroup H. A nearby woman's remains, tested to check whether they belonged to his mother Estrid, carried mtDNA haplogroup H5a with two HVR1 differences, making a mother–son relationship highly unlikely.

==== Queen Victoria ====
Queen Victoria carried mtDNA haplogroup H (16111T, 16357C, 263G, 315.1C), inferred because her daughter Princess Alice of the United Kingdom was the common maternal ancestor of Empress Alexandra of Russia and Prince Philip, Duke of Edinburgh, whose mtDNA matched. Royal genealogies indicate that Charles II of England and Catherine the Great also shared this matrilineal descent from Anne of Bohemia and Hungary.

=== Haplogroup J ===
==== Petrarch ====
DNA analysis of skeletal remains attributed to Francesco Petrarca in 2003 found that while the skull belonged to a woman, rib bone DNA belonged to mtDNA haplogroup J2.

==== Edward IV of England ====
King Edward IV of England and his brother Richard III of England (see Haplogroup G above), both sons of Cecily Neville, Duchess of York, shared mtDNA haplogroup J1c2c.

=== Haplogroup K ===
==== Mary Magdalene ====
A lock of hair from a reliquary at Saint-Maximin-la-Sainte-Baume basilica in France, traditionally attributed to Mary Magdalene, was reported by Gérard Lucotte to carry mtDNA haplogroup K (subclade K1a1b1a), from which Lucotte inferred a Pharisee maternal origin. Lucotte, a controversial geneticist, had also publicly claimed in 2005 to have identified DNA of Jesus Christ on the Argenteuil Tunic relic.

=== Haplogroup U ===
==== Oseberg ship remains ====
Ancient DNA testing of the younger of the two women buried in the Oseberg Ship assigned her to mtDNA haplogroup U7.

=== Haplogroup V ===
==== Benjamin Franklin ====
Testing of Charlene Chambers King, a 9th-great-granddaughter in the direct maternal line of Doras Folger (one of the six sisters of Benjamin Franklin's mother, Abiah Lee Folger), indicated that Benjamin Franklin belonged to mitochondrial haplogroup V (mutations T16298C, 315.1C, 309.1C, A263G, and T72C).

== See also ==
- Ancient DNA
- Genealogical DNA testing
- Paleogenetics
