= Mark G. Thomas =

British evolutionary geneticist

Mark G. Thomas (born 5 June 1964 on Kingston-upon-Thames, Surrey, England) is a human evolutionary geneticist, Professor of Evolutionary Genetics at the Research Department of Genetics, Evolution and Environment at University College London since 2009. Prior to this, he was Cancer Research Campaign Postdoctoral Research Fellow at King's College London and then Wellcome Trust postdoctoral researcher in the department of Biological Anthropology at the University of Cambridge. He has acted as Editor-in-chief of the journal Annals of Human Genetics from 2015 to 2019 and Oct 2020 to Jan 2021.

== Scientific career ==
Thomas is notable for a number of scientific publications in the fields of human demographic and evolutionary history inference, molecular phylogenetics of extinct species using ancient DNA, Cultural evolutionary modelling, and molecular biology. In 1994 Thomas was one of the first people to read the DNA sequence of the extinct woolly mammoth and in 1998 he coauthored a paper providing genetic support to the claim of recent patrilineal common ancestry among the Jewish priestly caste known as Kohanim (singular "Kohen", "Cohen", or Kohane). Between 2000 and 2003 Thomas coauthored several other papers on the origins of various Jewish and Judaic groups, including the Lemba, otherwise known as the "Black Jews of Southern Africa". In 2002 Thomas coauthored a paper providing Y chromosome evidence for a very high Anglo-Saxon component of patrilineal ancestry in central England. This result proved unpalatable for many archaeologists and led to Thomas developing the "apartheid-like social structure" model to explain the discrepancy between archaeological and genetic estimates of the scale of Anglo-Saxon migration.

Thomas has also worked extensively on the evolution of lactase persistence (see Lactose intolerance), the ability of some humans to produce the enzyme lactase throughout their adult life and thus to consume appreciable quantities of fresh milk without the discomforts of lactose malabsorption. In 2004 he led a study to show that most lactase persistent Africans did not have the same mutation causing it as Europeans. In 2007, in collaboration with Joachim Burger's group in Mainz, Germany, he showed that the genetic variant that causes lactase persistence in most Europeans (-13,910*T) was rare or absent in early farmers from central Europe. In 2009 Thomas led a computer simulation study indicating that lactase persistence started to co-evolve with the culture of dairying in the LBK (Linearbandkeramik) culture.

In 2009 – in collaboration with Prof Stephen Shennan and Dr Adam Powell – Thomas published a study in the journal Science showing that population density and or migratory activity are likely to be a major determinants in the maintenance or loss of culturally inherited skills, and that this seemed to explain a number of curious features of the appearance of behavioural modernity in humans at different times in different parts of the world.

Together with Kristian Kristiansen at the University of Gothenburg and Kurt Kjaer at the University of Copenhagen, Thomas was awarded a major European Research Council synergy grant in 2020, totalling €10 million over six years. This project (titled 'COREX: From correlations to explanations: towards a new European prehistory') will study human biological and cultural evolution from the Neolithic to the Bronze Age through a combination of genomic, archaeological, environmental and isotopic datasets.

== Selected scientific publications ==
- Hagelberg, E; Thomas, MG; Cook Jr, CE; Sher, AV; Baryshnikov, GF; Lister, AM (1994). "DNA from ancient mammoth bones". Nature. 370: 333–334.
- Thomas, MG; Skorecki, K; Ben-Ami, H; Parfitt, T; Bradman, N; Goldstein, DB (1998). "Origins of Old Testament priests". Nature. 394 (6689): 138–40. doi:10.1038/28083. PMID 9671297.
- Thomas, M. G.; Hagelberg, E.; Jone, H. B.; Yang, Z.; Lister, A. M. (2000a). "Molecular and morphological evidence on the phylogeny of the Elephantidae". Proc R Soc Lond B Biol Sci. 267: 2493–500.
- Thomas, M. G.; Parfitt, T.; Weiss, D. A.; Skorecki, K.; Wilson, J. F.; Roux, M.; Bradman, N.; Goldstein, D. B. (2000b). ""Y Chromosomes Traveling South: The Cohen Modal Haplotype and the Origins of the Lemba—the "Black Jews of Southern Africa". Am J Hum Genet. 66: 674–86. doi:10.1086/302749. PMC 1288118. PMID 10677325.
- Thomas, M. G.; Stumpf, M. P.; Harke, H. (2006). "Evidence for an apartheid-like social structure in early Anglo-Saxon England". Proc Biol Sci. 273: 2651–7.
- Burger, J.; Kirchner, M.; Bramanti, B.; Haak, W.; Thomas, M. G. (2007). "Absence of the Lactase-Persistence associated allele in early Neolithic Europeans". Proceedings of the National Academy of Sciences USA. 104: 3736–3741.
- Itan, Yuval; Powell, Adam; Beaumont, Mark A.; Burger, Joachim; Thomas, Mark G. (2009). "The Origins of Lactase Persistence in Europe". PLoS Comput Biol. 5 (8): e1000491.
- Powell, A.; Shennan, S.; Thomas, M.G. (2009). "Late Pleistocene Demography and the Appearance of Modern Human Behavior". Science. 324: 1298–1301.
- Bramanti, B.; Thomas, M. G.; Haak, W.; Unterlaender, M.; Jores, P.; Tambets, K.; Antanaitis-Jacobs, I.; Haidle, M. N.; Jankauskas, R.; Kind, C.-J.; Lueth, F.; Terberger, T.; Hiller, J.; Matsumura, S.; Forster, P.; Burger, J. (2009). "Genetic Discontinuity Between Local Hunter Gatherers and Central Europe's First Farmers". Science. 326: 137–140.
- Malmström, Helena; Gilbert, M.Thomas P.; Thomas, Mark G.; Brandström, Mikael; Storå, Jan; Molnar, Petra; Andersen, Pernille K.; Bendixen, Christian; Holmlund, Gunilla; Götherström, Anders; Willerslev, Eske (2009). "Ancient DNA Reveals Lack of Continuity between Neolithic Hunter-Gatherers and Contemporary Scandinavians". Current Biology. 19: 1–5.
- Brace, Selina; Diekmann, Yoan; Booth, Thomas; Macleod, Ruairidh; Timpson, Adrian; Stephen, Will; Emery, Giles; Cabot, Sophie; Thomas, Mark G.; Barnes, Ian (2022-08-30). "Genomes from a medieval mass burial show Ashkenazi-associated hereditary diseases pre-date the 12th century". Current Biology. 32 (20): 4350–4359.e6. Bibcode:2022CBio...32E4350B. doi:10.1016/j.cub.2022.08.036. ISSN 0960-9822. PMC 10499757. PMID 36044903. S2CID 251935757.

== See also ==
- Y-chromosomal Aaron
- Lemba people
- Lactase persistence
- Behavioural modernity
