= Haplogroup R1a-SUR51 =

Human Y-chromosome DNA haplogroup

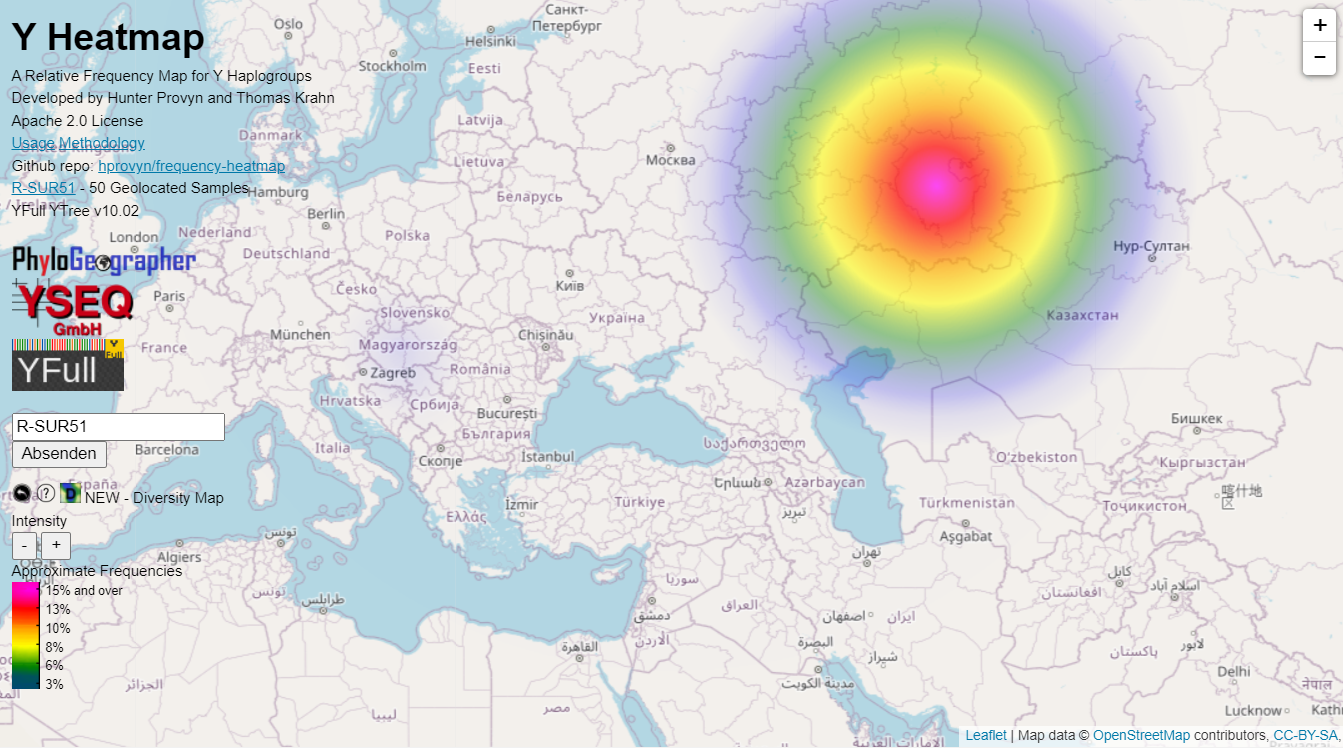
Distribution of the R-SUR51 haplogroup in Europe

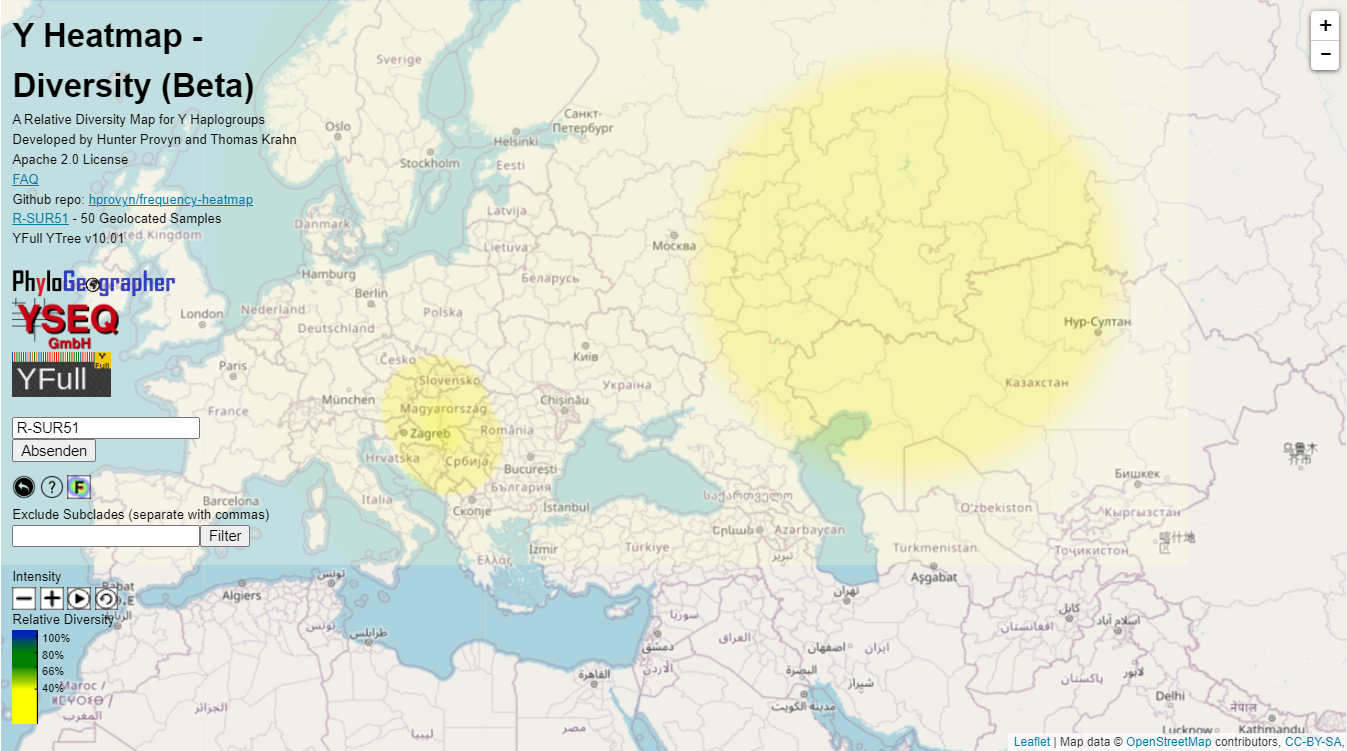
Diversity of th eR-SUR51 haplogroup in Europe

R1a-SUR51 is a Y-chromosomal paternal lineage found among modern populations including Bashkirs, Mishars and Hungarians.

The Institute of Hungarian Research determined the whole-genome data of King Béla III of Hungary, which was published in 2020, as well as that of King Saint Ladislaus of Hungary, published in 2023.

The paternal Y chromosome of both members of the Árpád dynasty among the Hungarian royal family belongs to haplogroup R-ARP (R1a1a1b2a2a1c3a3b), a subclade of R1a-SUR51 within the R-Z2123 clade.

== Ethnogenomic tree ==
R1a-Z645 > Z93 > Z94 > Z2124 > Z2125 > Z2123 > Y2632 > Y2633 > SUR51

Ancestral subclades of R1a-Y2632 have been identified among individuals associated with the Saka population of the Tien Shan, dated to approximately 427–422 BC.

== Clan–tribal affiliation and distribution area of representatives of the R1a-SUR51 lineage ==
Representatives of the R1a-SUR51 lineage are currently recorded in Bashkiria, Tatarstan, Nizhny Novgorod Oblast, and Ryazan Oblast, as well as in Hungary and Serbia.

=== Bashkirs ===
Sources:

- Uchalinsky District, Bashkortostan: Sura-Teleu, Zium-Teleu, Bure-Teleu, Oghuz-Teleu;
- Kuyurgazinsky, Burzyansky, and Kugarchinsky Districts of Bashkortostan: Huun-Qipsak, Qariy-Qipsak, Boshman-Qipsak, Sankem-Qipsak;
- Burzyansky and Kuyurgazinsky districts of Bashkortostan: Nughay-Buryan;
- Abzelilovsky District, Bashkortostan: Babsak-Qaraghay-Qipsak;
- Abzelilovsky and Meleuzovsky Districts of Bashkortostan: Shakman-Tamyan;
- Zianchurinsky and Khaibullinsky Districts of Bashkortostan, and Orenburg Oblast: Aqsak-Usergan;
- Aktanyshsky District, Tatarstan: Sarish-Qipsak.

=== Mishars ===
- Drozhzhanovsky District, Tatarstan: Barkhievs, Tuktamyshevs, and others;
- Nizhny Novgorod Oblast (Krasny Ostrov): Bilyaletdinovs and others;
- Temnikov, Ryazan Oblast: Derbyshevs and others.

=== Hungarians ===
- Fejér County.

=== Serbia ===
- South Bačka District Hungarians and Hungarian diaspora (Vojvodina).

== Lifetime of a common ancestor between the Árpád dynasty and Bashkirs carrying R1a-SUR51 ==
According to research by Péter L. Nagy, Judit Olasz, and their co-authors, the estimated lifetime of the most recent common paternal ancestor between Bashkir carriers of R1a-SUR51 and the Árpád dynasty dates to the beginning of the Common Era.

In contrast, Bulat A. Muratov has proposed a later divergence date, placing the separation between Bashkir R1a-SUR51 lineages and the Árpád dynasty in the 7th century AD.
