= Paleogenetics =

Study of the past through preserved genetic material

Paleogenetics is the study of the past through the examination of preserved genetic material from the remains of ancient organisms. Emile Zuckerkandl and Linus Pauling introduced the term in 1963, long before the sequencing of DNA, in reference to the possible reconstruction of the corresponding polypeptide sequences of past organisms. The first sequence of ancient DNA, isolated from a museum specimen of the extinct quagga, was published in 1984 by a team led by Allan Wilson.

Paleogeneticists do not recreate actual organisms, but piece together ancient DNA sequences using various analytical methods. Fossils are "the only direct witnesses of extinct species and of evolutionary events" and finding DNA within those fossils exposes tremendously more information about these species, potentially their entire physiology and anatomy.

The oldest DNA yet sequenced dates to around two million years ago and was extracted from sediments in northern Greenland.

== Applications ==
=== Evolution ===
Similar DNA sequences and their encoded proteins are found in different species. This similarity is directly linked to the sequence of the DNA (the genetic material of the organism). Due to the improbability of this being random chance, and its consistency too long to be attributed to convergence by natural selection, these similarities are best explained by common ancestry. This allows DNA sequences to be compared between species. Comparing an ancient genetic sequence to later or modern ones can be used to determine ancestral relations, while comparing two modern genetic sequences can determine, within error, the time since their last common ancestor.

Ancient DNA research allows scientists to uncover how past organisms lived, including insights into their health, genetics, and interactions with their environment. Metagenomic methods, which study the DNA present from multiple sources in an environmental sample, can be used to identify many different organisms in one fossil sample.

==== Human evolution ====
Paleogenetics opens up many new possibilities for the study of hominin evolution and dispersion. By analyzing the genomes of hominin remains, researchers can trace their lineage and estimate common ancestry. The reconstruction of the Neanderthal (Homo neanderthalensis) genome from fossil sources allowed the first genetic inquiries into archaic human relatives. H. neanderthalensis was shown to be one of the closest living relatives of Homo sapiens, until its lineage died out approximately 40,000 years ago.

Denisovans, a distinct lineage of hominin initially categorized from a Siberian bone fragment from which DNA was able to be extracted, showed signs of having genes that are not found in any Neanderthal nor Homo sapiens genome. Phylogenetically, its nuclear genome is more closely related to Neanderthals than Homo sapiens, and both species form a sister clade to our species. Whether Neanderthals or Denisovans are distinct species from Homo sapiens, rather than subspecies, is still debated within the paleoanthropological community.

Both Neanderthals and Denisovans have interbred with Homo sapiens (and with each other), and have left a genetic legacy in the modern human genome. Indeed, all Eurasian populations are estimated to have 1-4% of their genome originating from archaic humans. This statistic rises to ~5% in Oceanian populations, likely due to Denisovan contributions.

=== Evolution of culture ===
Looking at DNA can give insight into lifestyles of people of the past. Paleogenetic research has linked genetic changes to cultural and behavioral development in early human life. Neanderthal DNA shows that they lived in small temporary communities. DNA analysis can also show dietary restrictions and mutations, such as the fact that Homo neanderthalensis was lactose-intolerant. Studies of ancient farming communities have shown how the migration of agriculture and animal domestication in Europe during the Neolithic period was accompanied by genetic mixing between near eastern farmers and local hunters and gatherers. Such findings have made it easy to compare the genetic data with cultural transitions documented in archaeological records.

== Archaeology ==
=== Recovery and reconstruction of ancient DNA ===
Many advances have been made to studying archeological remains, such as the recovery of ancient DNA. DNA needs to be isolated in order for it to be recovered. Ancient material usually goes through dire environmental conditions and extensive microbial invasion, making it difficult to analyze. Therefore, researchers rely on a multitude of techniques in order to extract the DNA to get the most recovery possible. Polymerase chain reaction (PCR) techniques developed in the 1980s and 1990s are vital ancient DNA sequencing, allowing researchers to use naturally occurring and modified DNA polymerase enzymes (which replicate DNA molecules in living organisms) in a laboratory to amplify the amount of genetic materia recovered from fossils. Combined with high-throughput sequencing (HTS) methods, the recovery process has been streamlined, though it remains a delicate and extremely contamination-sensitive process. Techniques developed to further optimize the process include silica-based extraction protocols, light pre-digestion of calcified samples, tissue selection and sampling methods, and contamination depletion algorithms to identify and remove unwanted DNA sequences.

The areas prone for researchers to collect DNA include bone and teeth. After the extraction of DNA, it comes out fragmented, therefore, other techniques are needed to reconstruct it. Many techniques to reconstruct DNA, similar to the recovery techniques, include PCR, HTS pathways, library construction strategies, enrichment and target capture methods, data authentication and damage modelling, and epigenomic reconstruction.

=== Ancient disease ===
Studying DNA of the deceased also allows us to look at the medical history of human and animal species by looking specifically at DNA of pathogens that once infected them. By looking back, we can discover when certain diseases first appeared and began to afflict different species, including humans. Origins of different diseases have become known through this ancient DNA analysis, including Yersinia pestis (plague), Mycobacterium tuberculosis (tuberculosis) and Variola virus (smallpox).

==== Ötzi ====
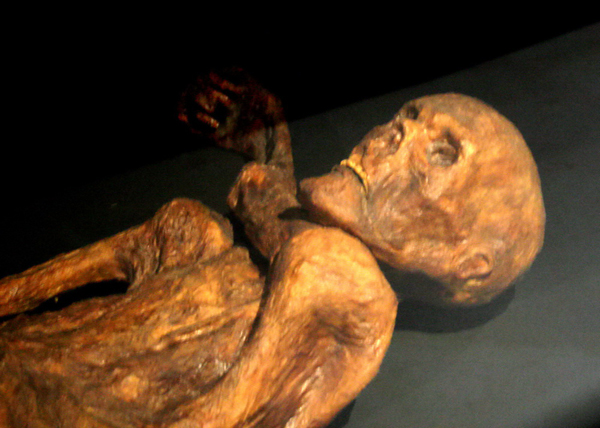
The reconstructed mummified remains of Ötzi the Iceman. His preserved DNA brought more understanding to ancient human genetics.

Ötzi died around 3,300 B.C., and his remains were discovered frozen in the Eastern Alps, near the Austria- Italy border in 1991 by a couple of hikers. His genetic material was analyzed in the 2010s. His DNA brought insight into prehistoric life, or more precisely, into the Copper Age of Europe. According to his DNA, Ötzi had brown eyes and a tan complexion. Further study found that he was lactose intolerant, it was assumed by scientists that this allele was rare to see in the Copper Ages, it was originally thought this allele gained popularity in the Middle Ages. Ötzi is the earliest recorded case of, Borrelia burgdorferi, also known as Lyme disease. The presence of Lyme disease in his bones raised questions about the disease's historical impact and the symptoms it may have caused in ancient populations.

=== Domestication of animals ===
Not only can past humans be investigated through paleogenetics, but the organisms they had an effect on can also be examined. Through examination of the divergence found in domesticated species such as cattle and the archaeological record from their wild counterparts; the effect of domestication can be studied. This could tell us a lot about the behaviors of the cultures that domesticated them. The genetics of these animals also reveals traits not shown in the paleontological remains, such as certain clues as to the behavior, development, and maturation of these animals. The diversity in genes can also tell where the species were domesticated, and how these domesticates migrated from these locations elsewhere.

==== Qinchuan cattle ====
An example of how paleogenetics can help understand domestication is through studying Qinchuan cattle, specifically in China. Original Qinchuan cattle (QCC) are the traditional population, meaning the population that humans have not changed or selectively bred. Over time, breeders selected certain Qinchuan cattle with cattle that have traits like bigger size or even better quality meat and breed those animals together. The term for the offspring of cattle due to selective breeding is known as the new strain (QNC). Researchers used genomic analysis to be able to compare the genomes of QNC, their ancestors (QCC), and another local breed called Zaeosheng cattle (ZSC). Both QNC and ZSC have parts of their DNA that came from European breeds of Bos taurus, which are cows from Europe with characteristics like large size and better meat quality. The DNA sequences of these European breeds of Bos Taurus mirrored more in QNC and ZSC than QCC. This indicated that the crossbreeding with European cattle most likely led to the larger body size and better quality of meat in QNC. Certain genes like MEF2A and SMAD2 were also found, which are linked to muscle development in the QNC. Overall, enhancing certain traits can occur by targeting genes, and paleogenomics can demonstrate it.

== Challenges ==
Ancient remains usually contain only a small fraction of the original DNA of an organism, often fragmented into very short sequences. These short fragments can make genome assembly and accurate sequence alignment difficult, especially in species with no close modern relatives. This is due to the degradation of DNA in dead tissue by biotic and abiotic decay. DNA preservation depends on a number of environmental characteristics, including temperature, humidity, oxygen and sunlight. Remains from regions with high heat and humidity typically contain less intact DNA than those from permafrost or caves, where remains may persist in cold, low oxygen conditions for several hundred thousand years. In addition, DNA degrades much more quickly following excavation of materials, and freshly excavated bone has a much higher chance of containing viable genetic material. After excavation, bone may also become contaminated with modern DNA (i.e. from contact with skin or unsterilized tools), which can create false-positive results. There are also analytical challenges with interpreting paleogenetic data. Ancient DNA can exhibit post-mortem damage that can mimic a genuine genetic mutation, such as changing of base pairs, when it is actually chemical decay. Distinguishing between evolutionary variation from chemical errors requires advanced computational programs for these processes to be repeated. Scientists use the models and repeated experiments to set apart the differences. They can use their genetic finding along with archeological evidence to better understand a civilization.

== See also ==
- Ancestral reconstruction
- Ancestral sequence reconstruction
- Ancient DNA
- Ancient pathogen genomics
- Archaeogenetics
- Molecular clock
- Paleobiochemistry
- Paleogenomics
- Paleovirology
