= Joachim Burger =

German anthropologist and geneticist

- Born: 27 June 1969 (age 57); Aschaffenburg, Bavaria, West Germany

Joachim Burger (born 27 June 1969 in Aschaffenburg, Germany) is a German anthropologist and population geneticist based at Johannes Gutenberg University, Mainz, Germany, where he runs the Palaeogenetics Group at the Institute of Organismic and Molecular Evolution (iomE).

== Scientific career ==
Burger has pioneered the application of ancient DNA technology to resolve anthropological and archaeological questions, particularly concerning humans and domestic animals in the Holocene period. He received his MA in anthropology in 1997, and his PhD in biology at the Georg-August-University, Göttingen, Germany, in 2000. He was made professor (junior professor) in molecular archaeology in 2005, and professor in anthropology in 2010. He is based at Johannes Gutenberg University in Mainz, Germany.

The main focus of Burger's research is human population genetics of Europe in the early Holocene, and of the transition from the late Roman to the Early Mediaeval period. He applies palaepopulation-genetic methods, i.e. uses ancient DNA data from archaeological skeletons and statistical inference methods to compare these "fossil" DNA sequences amongst each other and to modern-day populations. He pioneered the field of human palaeo-population genetics. Together with an international team he showed in 2009 that the first European farmers were immigrants to the continent and not descendants of local hunter-gatherers. In 2016, he published the first ancient genome from the Fertile Crescent. The study demonstrates that the first Neolithic farmers had populated Europe from the western/central part of Anatolia but not from the Fertile Crescent. He also works on the population genetics of animal domestication. Burger also studies European population development from Late Antiquity into the Early Middle Ages. His 2026 study demonstrates genetic and cultural continuity, including the persistence of the late antique Christian family system, and shows that early medieval societies in southern Germany emerged from the transformation of late Roman populations in the northern provinces.

Burger also is the editor of the journal, Archaeological and Anthropological Sciences and corresponding member of the German Archaeological Institute (DAI).

== Selected scientific publications ==
1. Broushaki, F., Thomas, M.G., et al., Wegmann, D., Hellenthal, G., Burger, J. (2016) Early Neolithic genomes from the eastern Fertile Crescent. Science 353(6298):499-503.

2. Hofmanová Z, Kreutzer S, et al., Papageorgopoulou C and Burger J (2016). Early farmers from across Europe directly descended from Neolithic Aegeans. PNAS 113: 6886-6891.

3. Scheu, A., Powell, A., Bollongino, R., Vigne, J. D., Tresset, A., Cakirlar, C., Benecke, N., Burger, J. (2015) The genetic prehistory of domesticated cattle from their origin to the spread across Europe. BMC Genet 16:54

4. Lazaridis, I., Patterson, N., Mittnik, A., Renaud, G., Mallick, S., Sudmant, P.H., Schraiber, J.G., Castellano, S., Kirsanow, K., Economou, Chr., Bollongino, R., ... 80 coauthors..., Eichler, E.E., Burger, J., Slatkin, M., Pääbo, S., Kelso, J., Reich, D., Krause, J. (2014) Ancient human genomes suggest three ancestral populations for present day Europeans. Nature 513, 409 413.

5. Wilde, S., Timpson, A., Kirsanow, K., Kaiser, E., Kayser, M., Unterländer, M., Hollfelder, N., Potekhina, I.D., Schier, W., Thomas, M.G., and Burger, J. (2014) Direct evidence for positive selection of skin, hair, and eye pigmentation in Europeans during the last 5,000 y. PNAS 111(13):4832 4837.

6. Bollongino, R., Nehlich, O., Richards, M., Orschiedt, J., Thomas, M.G., Sell, C., Fajko.ova, Z., Powell, A., and Burger, J. (2013) 2000 Years of Parallel Societies in Stone Age Central Europe. Science 342(6157):479 481.

7. Bramanti, B., Thomas, M.G., Haak, W., Unterlaender, M., Jores, P., Tambets, K., Antanaitis Jacobs, I., Haidle, M.N., Jankauskas, R., Kind, C.J., Lueth, F., Terberger, T., Hiller, J., Matsumura, S., Forster, P., and Burger, J. (2009) Genetic discontinuity between local hunter gatherers and central Europe’s first farmers. Science 326(5949):137 140.

8. Itan, Y., Powell, A., Beaumont, M.A., Burger, J., and Thomas, M.G. (2009) The origins of lactase persistence in Europe. PLoS Computational Biology 5(8):e1000491.

9. Burger, J., Kirchner, M., Bramanti, B., Haak, W., and Thomas, M.G. (2007) Absence of the lactase-persistence-associated allele in early Neolithic Europeans. PNAS 104(10):3736-3741.

10. Haak, W., Forster, P., Bramanti, B., Matsumura, S., Brandt, G., Tänzer, M., Villems, R., Renfrew, C., Gronenborn, D., Alt, K.W., and Burger, J. (2005) Ancient DNA from the first European farmers in 7500-year-old Neolithic sites. Science 310(5750):1016-1018.
