= Tamyan =

Tam'yan Тамьян
- Village
- Location within Bashkortostan Location within Russia
- Coordinates: 52°54′N 55°56′E
- Country: Russia
- Region: Bashkortostan
- District: Meleuzovsky District
- Time zone: UTC+5:00

Tam'yan (Russian: Тамьян; Bashkir: Тамъян, Tam'yan) is a rural locality (a village) in Meleuzovsky Selsoviet, Meleuzovsky District, Bashkortostan, Russia. The population was 353 as of 2010. There are 15 streets.

== Geography ==
Tamyan is located 6 km south of Meleuz (the district's administrative centre) by road. Kuzminskoye is the nearest rural locality.
