= Carles Lalueza-Fox =

Spanish biologist

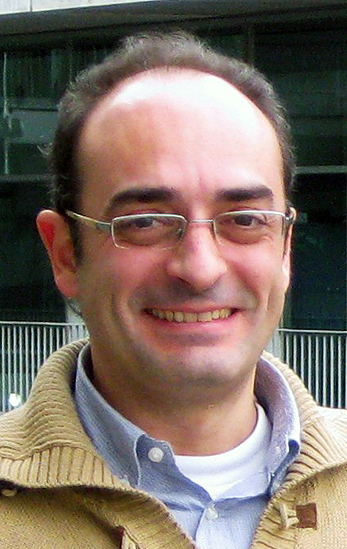
- Born: Carles Lalueza Fox; 1965 (age 59–60); Barcelona, Spain
- Occupation: Biology

Carles Lalueza Fox (Barcelona, 1965) is a Spanish biologist specialized in the study of ancient DNA. A doctor in Biology for the University of Barcelona, he worked in Cambridge and Oxford as well as in the private genetics company CODE Genetics of Iceland. Since 2008, he has served as a research Scientist in the Institute of Evolutionary Biology (CSIC – Pompeu Fabra University).

He is a specialist in DNA recovery techniques from the remains of the past, in phylogenetic reconstruction of extinct species, in the rebuilding of past migrations in human populations and in the evolutionary genetics of Neanderthals. In 2010, the magazine Science published a study directed by Svante Pääbo, which demonstrated the presence of Neanderthal DNA in the Homo sapiens for the first time. Lalueza was one of the fifty investigators that collaborated on this project.

Lalueza-Fox also directed the first sequencing of a European mesolithic genome at the Institute of Evolutionary Biology in Barcelona (2014). The team of scientists led by him discovered that African versions of pigmentation genes determined his skin color, but that he had blue eyes now associated with northern Europeans.

== Bibliography ==
- 1999: Mensajes del pasado
- 2002: Razas, racismo y diversidad
- 2002: Dioses y monstruos
- 2003: El bestiario extinguido
- 2003: El color bajo la piel
- 2005: Genes de Neandertal
- 2006: Cuando éramos caníbales
- 2013: Palabras en el tiempo
- 2013: Genes, reyes e impostores
- 2017: Des-Extinctiones. Una inmersión rápida
- 2022: Inequality: A Genetic History

== Awards and honours ==
- Winner of the VII European Prize for Scientific Dissemination, promoted by the University of Valencia, for the book "Razas, racismo y diversidad". Year 2001.
- Winner of the VII prize for Scientific Literature, promoted by the Fundació Catalana per a la recerca, for the book "El color bajo la piel". Year 2002.
- Winner of the first international essay prize Esteban de Terreros (Spanish Foundation for Science and Technology) for the book "Genes de Neandertal". Year 2005.
- Winner of the XVIII prize Prismas House of Science (La Coruña) for the book "Cuando éramos caníbales". Year 2005.
- Winner of the City of Barcelona Award for Scientific Research in 2007.
