= Erika Hagelberg =

British biologist and professor

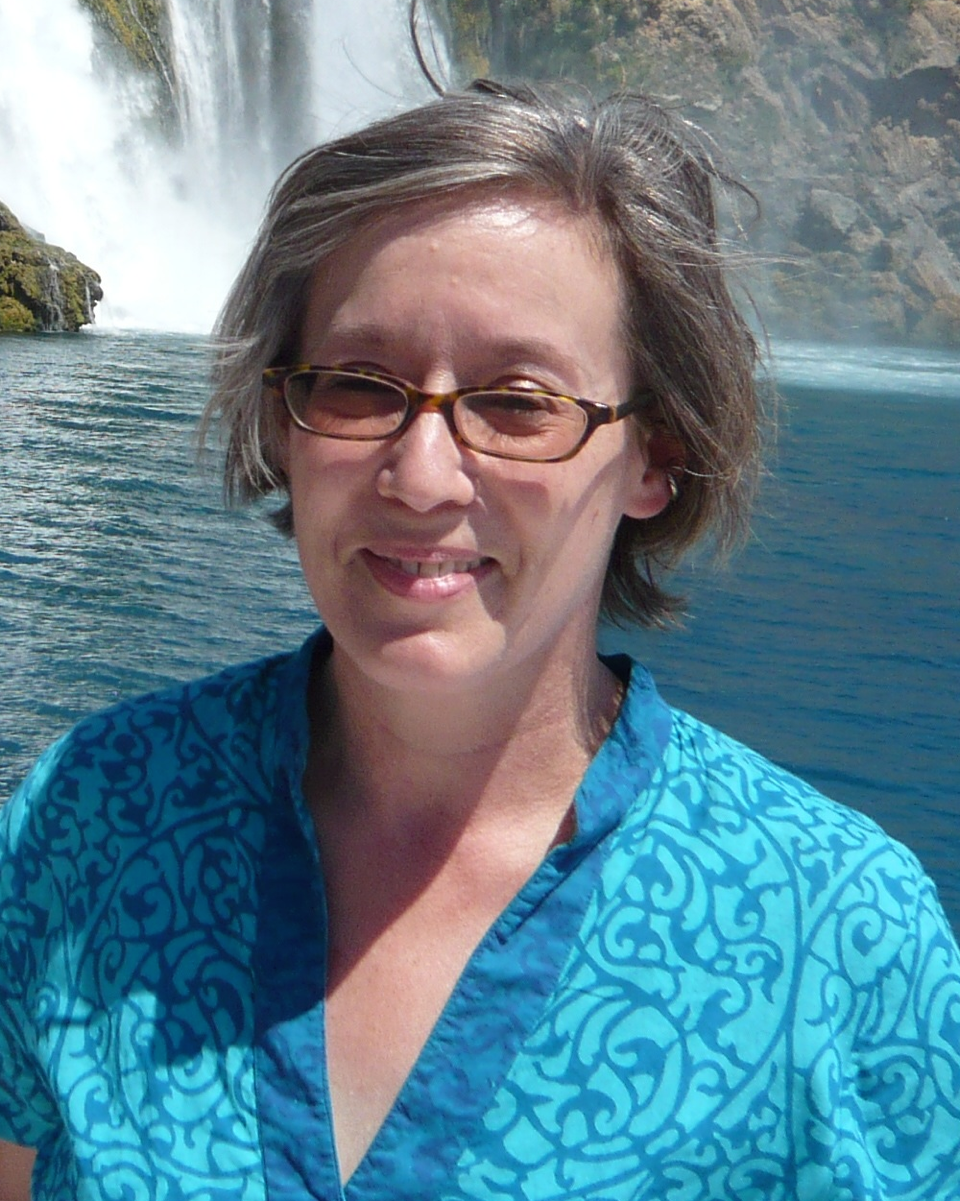
- Education: University of London; University of Cambridge
- Occupation: Professor
- Known for: Ancient DNA; Pacific genetics Forensic identification
- Scientific career
- Workplaces: University of Oslo; University of Otago; John Radcliffe Hospital

Erika Hagelberg is a British evolutionary geneticist and Professor of Biosciences at the University of Oslo. She is a world-leading expert on ancient DNA, pioneering a means to extract DNA from bones in the 1980s and 1990s. Traditionally, DNA could only be found in soft tissues, but Hagelberg developed techniques to recover small quantities of DNA from bone. Once the DNA has been extracted, it is possible to use the polymerase chain reaction to determine the sequence of nucleotides. Her research has had significant impact in evolutionary biology and forensic science.

== Education and early career ==
At the age of 13, Hagelberg's father escaped from Nazi Germany to the United Kingdom on the Kindertransport in 1939. Hagelberg studied biochemistry at the University of London and earned her bachelor's degree in 1977. She completed a Master's in History and Philosophy of Science from University College London. She moved to the University of Cambridge for her doctoral studies, and was awarded her PhD degree from the Department of Biochemistry in 1983. Her thesis is entitled The Biochemistry of Activation and Germination of Bacterial Spores.

== Research ==
Hagelberg works in the analysis of ancient DNA from archaeological bones. She joined the University of Oxford in 1987, where she worked at the John Radcliffe Hospital alongside Bryan Sykes and Robert E. M. Hedges. At Oxford, Hagelberg collaborated with Alec Jeffreys on the applications of bone DNA in forensic science. Jeffreys once described her as being able to "get DNA out of a stone, just about". Jeffreys and Hagelberg worked on single tandem repeat typing. Her early work included the analysis of bones from the Mary Rose. Hagelberg identified pig DNA in a leg bone from the food stores in the Mary Rose.

Jeffreys and Hagelberg demonstrated the DNA analysis could be used to identify the skeletal remains of a murder victim. Unfortunately, the body had been in the ground for so long that it had disintegrated. They could not use conventional DNA fingerprinting to analyse the DNA, and had to develop more sophisticated techniques. In the 1990s, she was one of the first people to use bone DNA analysis for forensic identification.

=== Identification of Josef Mengele remains ===
Hagelberg's DNA extraction technique was used to identify bones found in Brazil that were believed to belong to Josef Mengele. With Jeffreys, Hagelberg extracted DNA from a skeleton that had been buried for several years, and compared it with that of Mengele's family members. Their discovery closed a case of war crime that had stayed open for half a century.

=== Identification of the Romanov family remains ===
Hagelberg played a key role in the identification of remains of the Romanov family, the Russian imperial family, who were murdered in 1918 by the Bolsheviks. Their bodies had been mutilated with grenades before burial to prevent identification. Nine skeletons were analysed, including those of the putative Tsarina and three of her daughters, and their DNA was compared to that of living descendants. Hagelberg conducted the laboratory analysis, extracting, amplifying, and sequencing the bone samples, blindly and in a separate laboratory. She extracted DNA from bone fragments using a method she had developed previously, now modified, as described in her 1991 article coauthored with the molecular biologist John Clegg. Hagelberg removed the outer surfaces of bone fragments from the skeletons by sanding with a flap-wheel attached to a high-speed drill. The remaining bone was frozen in liquid nitrogen, ground to a fine powder, mixed with proteinase, extracted three times, centrifuged in a Centricon 30 microconcentrator, washed and centrifuged again. The DNA derived from this process was compared with blood samples from maternal relatives of the Tsar and Tsarina, supplied as a liquid or stains on cotton cloth, which were then extracted.

Hagelberg has also used mitochondrial DNA to study the migration of human populations. "Bone DNA-typing allows the direct investigation of the genetic affinities of past populations". Hagelberg extracted DNA from mammoth bones. She used a molecular clock based on cytochrome b on two Asian specimens, one from the Taymyr Peninsula, and the other from the region of the Allaikha River. The analysis of these Siberian samples, which were provided through the Russian Academy of Sciences, has consequences for the taxonomy of Mammuthus.

In 1998, Hagelberg left Cambridge and joined the University of Otago in New Zealand. There she continued her research on human migrations in the Pacific Islands, by examining mitochondrial DNA polymorphisms in Polynesian and Melanesian bones to resolve conflicting opinions on the migratory patterns. She also investigated the genetic origins of the people of the Andaman Islands. She found that the Andamanese are genetically more similar to Asian as opposed to African populations, predicting they are descendants of the Paleolithic colonies in Southeast Asia. Hagelberg has also written on the evolution of language, and how social complexity is related to brain size. She is interested in how reliable mitochondrial DNA is in studies of human evolution and phylogenetics.

In 2002 Hagelberg joined the University of Oslo. Hagelberg investigates how definitions of biological race are used by evolutionary biologists. Her work has been covered in The Guardian and The New York Times. She has written several articles for Nature, including 'DNA from Ancient Mammoth Bones' and 'DNA from Ancient Easter Islanders'.

She has written several books and edited both The Oxford Companion to Archaeology and Life and Death in Asia Minor in Hellenistic, Roman and Byzantine Times: Studies in Archaeology and Bioarchaeology. She edited a themed issue of the Philosophical Transactions of the Royal Society on Ancient DNA.

== Awards and honours ==
In 2015, Hagelberg was awarded the Cheney Senior Fellowship from the University of Leeds. The Fellowship is awarded to scientists who have achieved international impact in their field. The Fellowship gives leading scientists an opportunity to research at a leading UK institution, exploring new research ideas and building new collaborations.

== Bibliography ==
=== Books ===
- Life and Death in Asia Minor in Hellenistic, Roman, and Byzantine Times: Studies in Archaeology and Bioarchaeology, edited by J. Rasmus Brandt, Erika Hagelberg, Gro Bjørnstad, and Sven Ahrens (Oxford: Oxbow Books, 2017)

=== Journal articles and book chapters ===
- Gro Bjørnstad, Erika Hagelberg, 'Analysis of DNA in skeletal material from Hierapolis', Life and Death in Asia Minor from Hellenistic, Roman and Byzantine Times edited by J. Rasmus Brandt, Erika Hagelberg, Gro Bjørnstad, and Sven Ahrens (Oxford: Oxbow Books, 2017) pp. 219–27
- J. R. Brandt, S. Ahrens, C. C. Wenn, E. Hagelberg, G. Bjørnstad and others, 'Liv og død i Hierapolis: Norske utgravninger i en hellenistisk-romersk-bysantinisk by i Lilleasia', Viking (Norsk archeologisk årbok) 79 (2016) pp. 193–220
- Erika Hagelberg, 'Genetic affinities of the Rapanui', Skeletal Biology of the Ancient Rapa Nui, edited by G.W. Gill and V. Stefan (Cambridge: Cambridge University Press, 2016) pp. 182–201
- J. M. B. Motti, E. Hagelberg, J. Lindo, R. Malhi, C. M. Bravi, R. A. Guichón, 'Primer genoma mitochondrial en restos humanos de la costa de Santa Cruz, Argentina', Magallania (Chile) 43 (2015) pp. 119–31
- Chunxiang Li, Chang Ning, Erika Hagelberg, Hongjie Li, Yongbin Zhao, Wenying Li, Idelisi Abuduresule, Hong Zhu, Hui Zhou, 'Analysis of ancient human mitochondrial DNA from the Xiaohe cemetery: Insights into prehistoric population movements in the Tarim Basin, China', BMC Genetics (2015)
- Erika Hagelberg, Michael Hofreiter, and Christine Keyser, 'Ancient DNA: the First Three Decades', Philosophical Transactions of the Royal Society B: Biological Sciences (2015) pp. 1–6 https://doi.org/10.1098/rstb.2013.0371
- Erika Hagelberg et al., 'A Genetic Perspective on the Origins and Dispersal of the Austronesians: Mitochondrial DNA Variation from Madagascar to Easter Island', Past Human Migrations in East Asia: Matching Archaeology, Linguistics and Genetics, edited by Alicia Sanchez-Mazas et al. (London: Routledge, 2008)
- K. W. P. Miller, J. L. Dawson, & E. Hagelberg, 'A Concordance of Nucleotide Substitutions in the First and Second Hypervariable Segments of the Human mtDNA Control Region', International Journal of Legal Medicine 109 (1996) pp. 107–13.
- Erika Hagelberg and John Clegg, 'Isolation and Characterization of DNA from Archaeological Bone', Proceedings of the Royal Society of London B (1991) 244 45–50
