= Krasny Ostrov =

Krasny Ostrov Красный Остров
- Settlement
- Location within Belgorod Oblast Location within Russia
- Coordinates: 50°56′N 37°46′E
- Country: Russia
- Region: Belgorod Oblast
- District: Chernyansky District
- Time zone: UTC+3:00

Krasny Ostrov (Russian: Красный Остров) is a rural locality (a settlement) in Chernyansky District, Belgorod Oblast, Russia. The population was 865 as of 2010. There are 13 streets.

== Geography ==
Krasny Ostrov is located 5 km west of Chernyanka (the district's administrative centre) by road. Chernyanka is the nearest rural locality.
