= Y-SNP =

A Y-SNP is a single-nucleotide polymorphism on the Y chromosome. Y-SNPs are often used in paternal genealogical DNA testing.

== SNP markers ==
A single nucleotide polymorphism (SNP) is a change to a single nucleotide in a DNA sequence. The relative mutation rate for an SNP is extremely low. This makes them ideal for marking the history of the human genetic tree. SNPs are named with a letter code and a number. The letter indicates the lab or research team that discovered the SNP. The number indicates the order in which it was discovered. For example, M173 is the 173rd SNP documented by the Human Population Genetics Laboratory at Stanford University, which uses the letter M.

== See also ==
- Mt-SNP
- Short tandem repeat
- Haplogroup
- Haplotype
- Genealogical DNA test
