= Genetic history of the British Isles =

The genetic history of the British Isles is the subject of research within the larger field of human population genetics. It has developed in parallel with DNA testing technologies capable of identifying genetic similarities and differences between both modern and ancient populations. The conclusions of population genetics regarding the British Isles in turn draw upon and contribute to the larger field of understanding the history of the human occupation of the area, complementing work in linguistics, archaeology, history and genealogy.

Research concerning the most important routes of migration into the British Isles is the subject of debate. Apart from the most obvious route across the narrowest point of the English Channel into Kent, other routes may have been important over the millennia, including a land bridge in the Mesolithic period, as well as maritime connections along the Atlantic coasts.

Genetic studies have revealed multiple migration waves into Britain and Ireland from the Palaeolithic onwards, with detectable regional differences among present-day populations. After the Last Glacial Maximum, hunter-gatherer groups carrying two distinct ancestries (GoyetQ2-related and Villabruna-related) repopulated Britain and Ireland, with the latter eventually becoming dominant. This hunter-gatherer ancestry was substantially replaced during the Neolithic revolution, c. 4000 BC, by groups carrying Early European Farmer (EEF) ancestry from the European mainland, who admixed to a certain extent with the existing hunter-gatherer population in some regions. At the start of the Bronze Age, another major population replacement occurred when migrating Bell Beaker groups, carrying a high proportion of Steppe-related ancestry, replaced around 90% of the Neolithic gene pool. Throughout the Bronze and Iron Ages, further migration from mainland Europe raised the proportion of Early European Farmer ancestry in southern Britain. This has been proposed as one possible mechanism for the introduction of Celtic languages.

Other potentially important historical periods of migration that have been subject to consideration in this field include the Roman era, the period of early Germanic influx, the Viking era, the Norman invasion of 1066, and the era of the European wars of religion.

== History of research ==
Early studies by Luigi Cavalli-Sforza used polymorphisms from proteins found within human blood (such as the ABO blood groups, Rhesus blood antigens, HLA loci, immunoglobulins, G6PD isoenzymes, amongst others). One of the lasting proposals of this study with regards to Europe is that within most of the continent the majority of genetic diversity may best be explained by immigration coming from the southeast towards the northwest or in other words from the Middle East towards Britain and Ireland. Cavalli-Sforza proposed at the time that the invention of agriculture might be the best explanation for this.

With the advent of DNA analysis modern populations were sampled for mitochondrial DNA to study the female line of descent and Y chromosome DNA to study male descent. As opposed to large scale sampling within the autosomal DNA, Y DNA and mitochondrial DNA represent specific types of genetic descent and can therefore reflect only particular aspects of past human movement. Later projects began to use autosomal DNA to gather a more complete picture of an individual's genome. For Britain, major research projects aimed at collecting data include the Oxford Genetic Atlas Project (OGAP) and more recently the People of the British Isles, also associated with Oxford.

Owing to the difficulty of modelling the contributions of historical migration events to modern populations based purely on modern genetic data, such studies often varied significantly in their conclusions. One early Y DNA study estimated a complete genetic replacement by the Anglo-Saxons, whilst another argued that it was impossible to distinguish between the contributions of the Anglo-Saxons and Vikings and that the contribution of the latter may even have been higher.

== Analyses of nuclear and ancient DNA ==
=== Paleolithic ===
The earliest modern humans to inhabit Britain during the Initial Upper Paleolithic (c. 45-40,000 years ago) produced stone tools of the Lincombian-Ranisian-Jerzmanowician (LRJ) technocomplex. While no Initial Upper Paleolithic remains from Britain have been genetically sampled, sampling of LRJ-associated individuals from Germany suggests that they belonged to an early diverging branch of the Out of Africa population, less closely related to modern non-Africans than all modern non-Africans are to each other, and unrelated to later Upper Palaeolithic European hunter-gatherers. These people carried the introgressed Neanderthal ancestry found in all modern non-Africans, from an interbreeding episode thought to have occurred around 45,000–49,000 years ago. European Upper Paleolithic hunter-gatherers from at least 37,000 years ago onwards are part of the "West Eurasian" branch, more closely related to modern Europeans than East Asians.

After the Last Glacial Maximum (LGM) resulted in Britain being deserted, there is evidence of repopulation of Britain and Ireland during the late Upper Paleolithic from c. 13,500 BC. The earliest inhabitants of Britain after recolonisation (as evidenced by sites such as Gough's Cave) were members of the Magdalenian culture, which evidence suggests had expanded from southern France and Spain after the end of the LGM, and had genetic continuity from members of the earlier Gravettian culture. From around 14,000 years ago, Magdalenian peoples were replaced across northern Europe, including in Britain, by people belonging to the genetically distinct Villabruna cluster, associated with the Epigravettian and related archaeological cultures. In Britain, this transition is evidenced by an individual from Kendrick's Cave, dated to approximately 14,100–13,460 years Before Present.

=== Mesolithic population ===
British Mesolithic hunter-gatherers, such as the famous Cheddar Man, were closely related to other Mesolithic people throughout Western Europe (the so-called Western Hunter Gatherer cluster, which are direct descendants of people from the Villabruna cluster) This population probably had blue or green eyes, lactose intolerance, dark hair and dark to very dark skin. British Mesolithic people probably contribute negligible ancestry to modern British people.

=== Continental Neolithic farmers ===
The change to the Neolithic in the British Isles (c. 4,000 BC) went along with a significant population shift. Neolithic individuals were close to Iberian and Central European Early and Middle Neolithic populations, modelled as having about 75% ancestry from Anatolian farmers with the rest coming from Western Hunter-Gatherers (WHG) in continental Europe. This suggests that farming was brought to the British Isles by sea from north-west mainland Europe, by a population that was, or became in succeeding generations, relatively large. In some regions, British Neolithic individuals had a small amount (about 10%) of WHG excess ancestry when compared with Iberian Early Neolithic farmers, suggesting that there was an additional gene flow from British Mesolithic hunter-gatherers into the newly arrived farmer population: while Neolithic individuals from Wales have no detectable admixture of local Western hunter-gatherer genes, those from South East England and Scotland show the highest additional admixture of local WHG genes, and those from South-West and Central England are intermediate.

=== The Beaker People ===
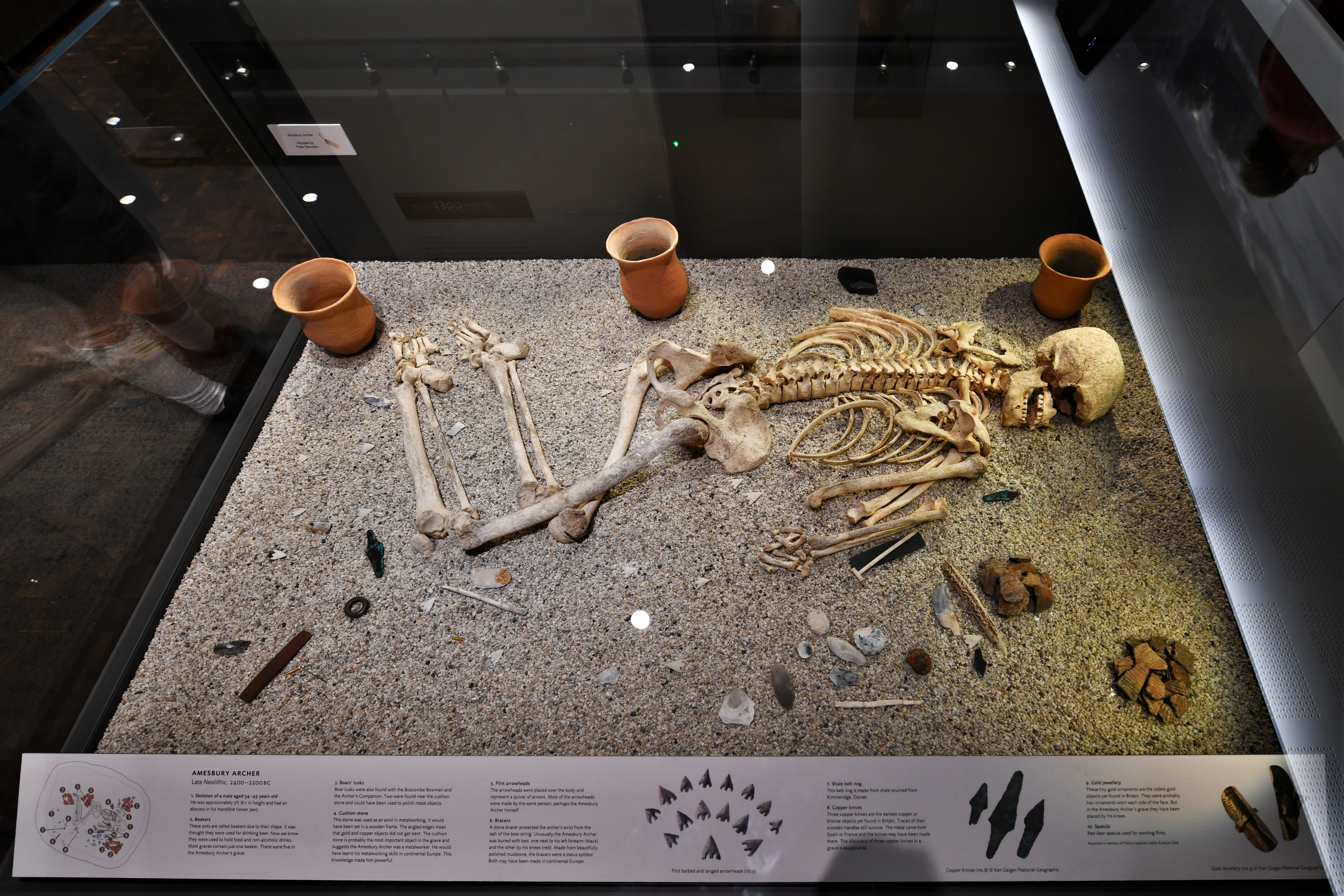
The Amesbury Archer (buried near Stonehenge, England, c. 2300 BC), grew up in Central Europe. Display at the Salisbury Museum

The spread of the Bell Beaker culture to Britain from the lower Rhine area in the early Bronze Age introduced high levels of steppe-related ancestry, resulting in a near-complete change of the local gene pool within a few centuries, replacing about 90% of the local Neolithic-farmer derived lineages between 2400 BC and 2000 BC, there had not been any steppe ancestry found in DNA samples that derived from burials before this time. This genetic replacement was in contrast to the spread of Bell Beaker culture in continental Europe which was accompanied by little genetic replacement. The people in the British Isles exhibiting the Beaker culture were likely an offshoot of the Corded Ware culture, as they had little genetic affinity to the Iberian Beaker people. With the large steppe-derived component, they had a smaller proportion of continental Neolithic and Western Hunter Gatherer DNA.

Both men and women with Steppe ancestry participated in the turnover in Neolithic Britain, as evidenced by the rise of the paternal haplogroup R1b-M269 and maternal haplogroups I, R1a and U4. The paternal haplogroup R1b was completely absent in Neolithic individuals, but represented more than 90% of the Y-chromosomes during Copper and Bronze Age Britain. The study also found that the Bell Beaker arrivals in Neolithic Britain had significantly higher genetic variants associated with light skin and eye pigmentation than the local population, but low frequencies of the SNP associated with lactase persistence in modern Europeans.

An earlier study had estimated that the modern English population derived somewhat just over half of their ancestry from a combination of Neolithic farmer and Western Hunter Gatherer ancestry, with the steppe-derived (Yamnaya-like) element making up the remainder. Scotland was found to have both more Steppe and more Western Hunter Gatherer ancestry than England. These proportions are similar to other Northwest European populations.

Strontium and oxygen isotope analysis of the Amesbury Archer, dating from c. 2300 BC (the richest burial in Britain in this period) found that he spent his childhood in Central Europe, probably in the region of the Alps.

=== Celts ===
Genetic evidence suggests that there was significant migration to Southern Britain of people from the adjacent mainland at the end of the Bronze Age around 1000 BC, around a millennium after the initial Bell-Beaker migration. This migration may have introduced the Celtic languages to Britain. Patterson et al. (2021) believes that these migrants were "genetically most similar to ancient individuals from France" and had higher levels of Early European Farmers (EEF) ancestry.

Cassidy et al. (2025) propose that gene flow across the Channel throughout the Bronze and Iron Ages is a plausible scenario for the introduction of Celtic languages to Britain. They found evidence for a significant increase in EEF ancestry in Middle-to-Late Iron Age individuals from Southern Britain, indicating substantial population movements across the channel during this period. The authors suggest that the further influx of EEF ancestry in the Iron Age may be the result of a secondary migration of Celtic-speaking groups, potentially resulting in linguistic changes in populations who may have already been speaking Celtic languages.

=== Anglo-Saxons ===
Southern Great Britain in AD 600 after the Anglo-Saxon settlement, showing England's division into multiple petty kingdoms

Researchers have used ancient DNA to determine the nature of the Anglo-Saxon settlement, as well as its impact on modern populations in the British Isles.

One 2016 study, using Iron Age and Anglo-Saxon era DNA found at grave sites in Cambridgeshire, calculated that ten modern-day eastern English samples had 38% Anglo-Saxon ancestry on average whilst ten Welsh and Scottish samples each had 30% Anglo-Saxon ancestry, with a large statistical spread in all cases. However, the authors noted that the similarity observed between the various sample groups was possibly due to more recent internal migration.

Another 2016 study conducted using evidence from burials found in northern England found that a significant genetic difference was present in bodies from the Iron Age and the Roman period on the one hand and the Anglo-Saxon period on the other, demonstrating a "profound impact" from the Anglo-Saxon migrations on the modern English gene pool. The differences varied with locations on a broad east-west basis, with samples from modern-day Wales were found to be similar to those from the Iron Age and Roman burials whilst samples from much of modern England, East Anglia in particular, were closer to the Anglo-Saxon-era burial. No specific percentages were given in the study.

A third study combined the ancient data from both of the preceding studies and compared it to a large number of modern samples from across Britain and Ireland. This study concluded that modern southern, central and eastern English populations were of "a predominantly Anglo-Saxon-like ancestry" whilst those from northern and southwestern England had a greater degree of indigenous origin.

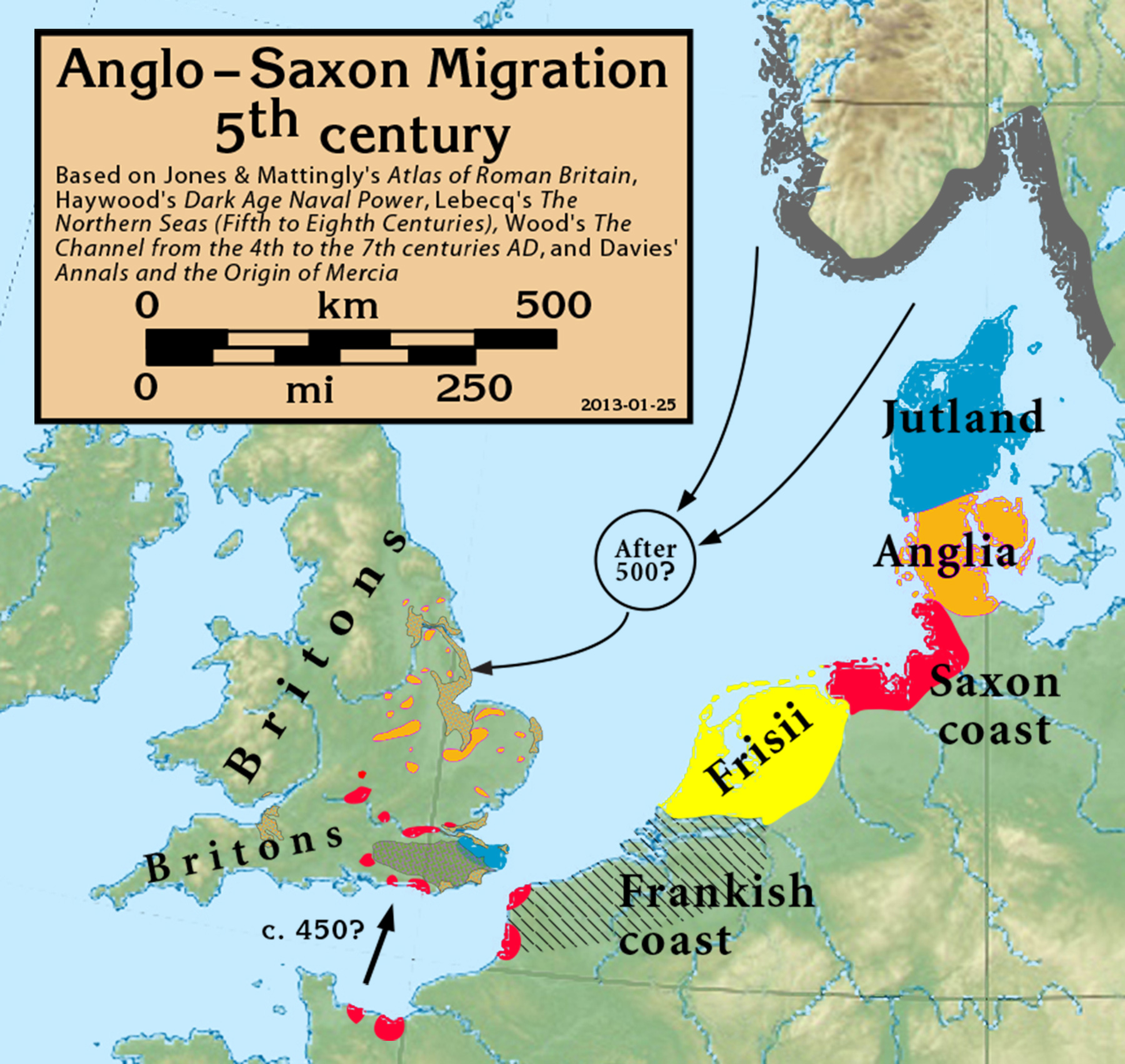
Possible routes of Anglo-Saxon migration in the 5th/6th centuries

In recent years, partly driven by new genetic studies, there has been a synthesis of migration and acculturation, with a return to a more migrationist perspective but with an emphasis on the regional variation of the ratio of Anglo-Saxon and Romano-Britons.

Heinrich Härke explains the nature of this agreement:

It is now widely accepted that the Anglo-Saxons were not just transplanted Germanic invaders and settlers from the Continent, but the outcome of insular interactions and changes. But we are still lacking explicit models that suggest how this ethnogenetic process might have worked in concrete terms.

A very important development in the twenty first century has been the growing use of genetic studies. At first these were very dependent on the study of Y Chromosome DNA which traces back male only and female only lineages and groups them with other people in different areas and countries. Later on there was a greater use of graveyard remains and greater sophistication of genetic studies.

==== Early Y chromosome studies ====
Many of the earliest attempts to examine the ancestry of British people using molecular evidence looked at Y chromosome DNA. Inheritance of sex-specific elements of the human genome allows the study of separate female-only and male-only lineages, using mitochondrial DNA and Y-chromosome DNA, respectively. Mitochondrial DNA ("mtDNA") and Y-chromosome DNA differ from the DNA of diploid nuclear chromosomes in that they are not formed from the combination of both parents' genes. Rather, males inherit the Y-chromosome directly from their fathers, and both sexes inherit mtDNA directly from their mothers. Consequently, they preserve a genetic record from person to descendant that is altered only through mutation.

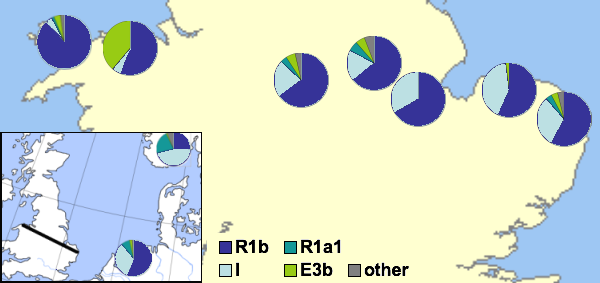
Map of Y-chromosome distribution from data derived from "Y chromosome evidence for Anglo-Saxon mass migration" by Weale et al. (2002)

An examination by Michael Weale in 2002 of Y-chromosome variation, sampled in an east–west transect across England and Wales, was compared with similar samples taken in Friesland in the Netherlands. It was selected for the study due to it being regarded as a source of Anglo-Saxon migrants, and because of the similarities between the Old English and Frisian languages. Samples from Norway were also selected, as this is a source of the later Viking migrations. It found that in England, in small population samples, 50% to 100% of paternal genetic inheritance was derived from people originating in the Germanic coastlands of the North Sea.

Other research by Cristian Capelli published in 2003 taken from a larger sample population and from more UK populations suggested that in southernmost England including Kent, continental (North German and Danish) paternal genetic input ranged between 25% and 45%, with a mean of 37%. East Anglia, the East Midlands, and Yorkshire all had over 50%. Across the latter much Viking settlement is attested. The study could not distinguish between North German and Danish populations, thus the relative proportions of genetic input derived from the Anglo-Saxon settlements and later Danish Viking colonisation could not be ascertained. The mean value of Germanic genetic input in this study was calculated at 54 per cent.

==== Modern population studies ====
A major study in 2015 based on data from the People of the British Isles project revealed regional patterns of genetic differentiation, with clear genetic clusters reflecting historical migrations and sometimes corresponding to the geographic boundaries of historical polities. Based on two separate analyses, the study found clear evidence in modern England of the Anglo-Saxon migration and identified the regions not carrying genetic material from these migrations. The authors argued that the proportion of "Saxon" ancestry in central and southern England was ranged from 10%–40%. Additionally, in the "non-Saxon" parts of the UK they found various genetic subgroups rather than a homogenous "Celtic" population, with little to no input in certain regions.

==== Ancient whole genome DNA studies ====
Recent genetic studies, based on data collected from skeletons found in Iron Age, Roman and Anglo-Saxon era burials, have concluded that the ancestry of the modern English population contains large contributions from both Anglo-Saxon migrants and Romano-British natives.

In 2016, through the investigation of burials in Cambridgeshire using ancient DNA techniques, researchers found evidence of intermarriage in the earliest phase of Anglo-Saxon settlement. The highest status grave of the burials investigated, as evidenced by the associated goods, was that of a female of local, British, origins; two other women were of Anglo-Saxon origin, and another showed signs of mixed ancestry. People of native, immigrant, and mixed ancestry were buried in the same cemetery, with grave goods from the same material culture, without any discernible distinction. The authors remark that their results run contrary to previous theories that have postulated strict reproductive segregation between natives and incomers. By studying rare alleles and employing whole genome sequencing, it was claimed that the continental and insular origins of the ancient remains could be discriminated, and it was calculated that a range of 25–40% of the ancestry of modern Britons is attributable to continental 'Anglo-Saxon' origins. The breakdown of the estimates given in this work into the modern populations of Britain determined that the population of eastern England is consistent with 38% Anglo-Saxon ancestry on average, with a large spread from 25 to 50%, and the Welsh and Scottish samples are consistent with 30% Anglo-Saxon ancestry on average, again with a large spread. The study also found that there is a small but significant difference between the mean values in the three modern British sample groups, with East English samples sharing slightly more alleles with the Dutch, and Scottish samples looking more like the Iron Age (Celtic) samples.

Another 2016 study analyzed nine ancient genomes of individuals from northern Britain, with seven from a Roman-era cemetery in York, and the others from earlier Iron-Age and later Anglo-Saxon burials. Six of the Roman genomes showed affinity with modern British Celtic populations, such as the Welsh, but were significantly different from eastern English samples. They also were similar to the earlier Iron-Age genome, suggesting population continuity, but differed from the later Anglo-Saxon genome, which was found to be similar to the samples from East Anglia, as well as other Anglo-Saxon era burials in Cambridgeshire (see above). This pattern was found to support a profound impact of migrations in the Anglo-Saxon period. The authors commented that the English population showed variation, with samples from the east and south showing greater similarity with the Anglo-Saxon burials and those in the north and west being closer to the Roman and Iron Age burials.

A 2018 study, focused on the genetics of Ireland, combined the ancient data from both of earlier studies and compared it to a large number of modern samples from across Britain and Ireland. This study found that modern southern, central and eastern English populations were of "a predominantly Anglo-Saxon-like ancestry", while those from northern and southwestern England had a greater degree of indigenous origin.

==== Gretzinger study ====
The Gretzinger study was a major genetic study in 2022 focusing specifically on the question of the Anglo-Saxon settlement sampled 460 northwestern European individuals dated to the medieval period - between approximately 200 and 1300 AD. These were compared with other modern and ancient sample sets. The study concluded that in eastern England, large-scale immigration, including both men and women, occurred in the post-Roman era, with an average of around 76% of the ancestry of these individuals deriving from the North Sea zone of continental Europe (i.e. medieval north Germans and Danish, with many samples having no admixture. There were also instances of such people living together and mixing with individuals with 100% local ancestry, who were genetically similar to modern and medieval Irish, Welsh and Scottish people.

They estimated that the ancestry of the present-day English ranges between 25% and 47% Continental North European (similar to historical northern Germans and Danish), 11% to 57% similar to the British Late Iron Age, and 14% to 43% IA-like (similar to France, Belgium and neighbouring parts of Germany). Continental North European (CNE) ancestry also mostly peaks in southeastern, eastern and central England, especially Sussex, the East Midlands and East Anglia and is lower in the west. As for the other populations of the British Isles, statistically satisfactory models presented in the article, which employed these ancient samples as a reference, indicate that 13–31% of the ancestry of the modern Scottish come from a CNE source, as do 16–24% of the modern Welsh, 13–26% of the modern Northern Irish, and 4–18% of the modern Irish.

The authors further noted that, although a large part of the genetic makeup of modern-day English people derives from the Anglo-Saxon migration event, it has been diluted by later migrations from a population source similar to that of Iron Age France and early medieval western Germany, probably the result of localized mobility between southern England and the Frankish areas of Europe during the Early Middle Ages, but which reached northern and eastern England after the arrival of the Anglo-Saxons. Substantial France IA-related ancestry is present only in England, but not in Wales, Scotland or Ireland, following a gradient from east to west in Britain.

=== Welsh people ===
The post-Roman period saw a significant alteration in the genetic makeup of southern Britain due to the arrival of the Anglo-Saxons; however, historical evidence suggests that Wales was little affected by these migrations. A study published in 2016 compared samples from modern Britain and Ireland with DNA found in skeletons from Iron Age, Roman and Anglo-Saxon era Yorkshire. The study found that most of the Iron Age and Roman era Britons showed strong similarities with both each other and modern-day Welsh populations, while modern southern and eastern English groups were closer to a later Anglo-Saxon burial.

Another study, using Iron Age and Anglo-Saxon samples from Cambridgeshire, concluded that modern Welsh people carry a 30% genetic contribution from Anglo-Saxon settlers in the post-Roman period; however, this could have been brought about due to later migration from England into Wales.

A third study, published in 2020 and based on Viking era data from across Europe, suggested that the Welsh trace, on average, 58% of their ancestry to the Brythonic people, up to 22% from a Danish-like source interpreted as largely representing the Anglo-Saxons, 3% from Norwegian Vikings, and 13% from further south in Europe such as Italy, to a lesser extent, Spain and can possibly be related to French immigration during the Norman period.

A 2015 genetic survey of modern British population groups found a distinct genetic difference between those from northern and southern Wales, which was interpreted as the legacy of Little England beyond Wales.

A study of a diverse sample of 2,039 individuals from the United Kingdom allowed the creation of a genetic map and the suggestion that there was a substantial migration of peoples from Europe prior to Roman times forming a strong ancestral component across England, Scotland, and Northern Ireland, but which had little impact in Wales. Wales forms a distinct genetic group, followed by a further division between north and south Wales, although there was evidence of a genetic difference between north and south Pembrokeshire as separated by the Landsker line. Speaking of these results, Professor Peter Donnelly, of the University of Oxford, said that the Welsh carry DNA which could be the most ancient in UK and that people from Wales are genetically relatively distinct.

=== Vikings ===
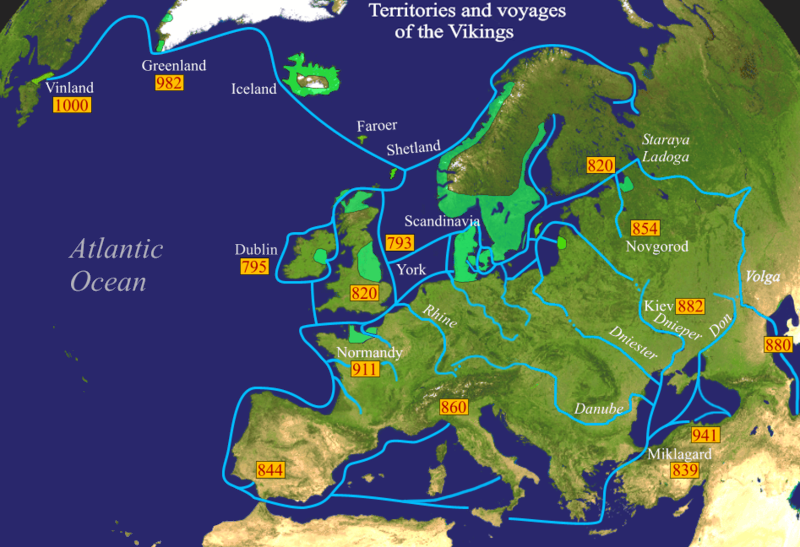
Scandinavian settlements (green) and voyages

Historical and toponymic evidence suggests a substantial Viking migration to many parts of northern Britain; however, particularly in the case of the Danish settlers, differentiating their genetic contribution to modern populations from that of the Anglo-Saxons has posed difficulties.

Conducted between 2002 and 2007, a study of men in the Wirral and historic western Lancashire (roughly modern Merseyside) showed substantial Scandinavian DNA admixture, at around as 38%; as high as around 50% among those bearing surnames present in the area before 1600. A similar percentage was found at Penrith in Cumbria, notably higher than the other sample areas of Llangefni, Wales (10%) and Mid-Cheshire (21%). Large scale immigration into these areas since the Industrial Revolution has probably greatly reduced the proportion of people with high Scandinavian DNA.

A study published in 2015 based on the People of the British Isles (PoBI) argued that the Norse influence on British genetics was limited; it found that Orkney was the only region of the UK with a significant Norwegian Viking DNA contribution (around 25%). The study also found Danish DNA across all regions, but suggested that this could in part be associated with earlier Anglo-Saxon migrations.

The results of the PoBI study have been disputed; a 2016 article by Jane Kershaw and Ellen C. Røyrvik found that a "German" DNA cluster (GER3), attributed by PoBI to Anglo-Saxons, originated close to the 8-11th century Viking settlement Hedeby and may partially reflect Danish Viking settlement. GER3 represents approximately 10% of DNA admixture in Southern and Central England.

A study published in 2020, which used ancient DNA from across the Viking world in addition to modern data, noted that ancient samples from Denmark showed similarities to samples from both modern Denmark and modern England. Whilst most of this similarity was attributed to the earlier settlement of the Anglo-Saxons, the authors of the study noted that British populations also carried a small amount of "Swedish-like" ancestry that was present in the Danish Vikings but unlikely to have been associated with the Anglo-Saxons. From this, it was calculated that the modern English population has approximately 6% Danish Viking ancestry, with Scottish and Irish populations having up to 16%. Additionally, populations from all areas of Britain and Ireland were found to have 3–4% Norwegian Viking ancestry.

=== Comparison between modern British and Irish populations ===
A 2015 study using data from the Neolithic and Bronze Ages showed a considerable genetic difference between individuals during the two periods, which was interpreted as being the result of a migration from the Pontic steppes. The individuals from the latter period, with significant steppe ancestry, showed strong similarities to modern Irish population groups. The study concluded that "these findings together suggest the establishment of central aspects of the Irish genome 4,000 years ago."

Another study, using modern autosomal data, found a large degree of genetic similarity between populations from northeastern Ireland, southern Scotland and Cumbria. This was interpreted as reflecting the legacy of the Plantation of Ulster in the 17th century.

According to a 2024 study, Neolithic farmer ancestries are highest in modern southern and eastern England but lower in Scotland, Wales and Cornwall. Steppe-related ancestries are inversely distributed, peaking in Scotland, Outer Hebrides and Ireland. WHG-related ancestries are also much higher in central and northern England. In general, hunter-gatherer ancestries like WHG increase the likelihood of darker skin and hair, Alzheimer's disease and traits related to cholesterol, blood pressure and diabetes among British people. But they decrease the likelihood of anxiety, guilty feelings and irritiability compared to Neolithic farmer ancestries. However, it should be cautioned that this "makes no direct reference to ancient phenotypes".

== Haplogroups ==
=== Mitochondrial DNA ===
Bryan Sykes broke mitochondrial results into twelve haplogroups for various regions of the isles:

- Haplogroup H
- Haplogroup I
- Haplogroup J
- Haplogroup T
- Haplogroup U
  - Haplogroup U2
  - Haplogroup U3
  - Haplogroup U4
  - Haplogroup U5
- Haplogroup V
- Haplogroup W
- Haplogroup X

Sykes found that the maternal haplogroup pattern was similar throughout England but with a distinct trend from east and north to west and south. Minor haplogroups were mainly found in the east of England. Sykes found Haplogroup H to be dominant in Ireland and Wales, though a few differences were found between north, mid and south Wales—there was a closer link between north and mid-Wales than either had with the south.

Studies of ancient DNA have demonstrated that ancient Britons and Anglo-Saxon settlers carried a variety of mtDNA haplogroups, though type H was common in both.

=== Y chromosome DNA ===
Sykes also designated five main Y-DNA haplogroups for various regions of Britain and Ireland.

- Haplogroup R1b
- Haplogroup R1a
- Haplogroup I
- Haplogroup E1b1b
- Haplogroup J

Haplogroup R1b is dominant throughout Western Europe. While it was once seen as a lineage connecting Britain and Ireland to Iberia, where it is also common, it is now believed that both R1b and R1a entered Europe with Indo-European migrants likely originating around the Black Sea; R1a and R1b are now the most common haplotypes in Europe.

One common R1b subclade in Britain is R1b-U106, which reaches its highest frequencies in North Sea areas such as southern and eastern England, the Netherlands and Denmark. Due to its distribution, this subclade is often associated with the Anglo-Saxon migrations. Ancient DNA has shown that it was also present in Roman Britain, possibly among descendants of Germanic mercenaries.

Ireland, Scotland, Wales and northwestern England are dominated by R1b-L21, which is also found in northwestern France (Brittany), the north coast of Spain (Galicia), and western Norway. This lineage is often associated with the historic Celts, as most of the regions where it is predominant have had a significant Celtic language presence into the modern period and associate with a Celtic cultural identity in the present day. It was also present among Celtic Britons in eastern England prior to the Anglo-Saxon and Viking invasions, as well as Roman soldiers in York who were of native descent.

There are various smaller and geographically well-defined Y-DNA Haplogroups under R1b in Western Europe.

Haplogroup R1a, a close cousin of R1b, is most common in Eastern Europe. In Britain, it has been linked to Scandinavian immigration during periods of Viking settlement. 25% of men in Norway belong to this haplogroup; it is much more common in Norway than in the rest of Scandinavia. Around 9% of all Scottish men belong to the Norwegian R1a subclade, which peaks at over 30% in Shetland and Orkney.

Haplogroup I is a grouping of several quite distantly related lineages. Within Britain, the most common subclade is I1, which also occurs frequently in northwestern continental Europe and southern Scandinavia, and has thus been associated with the settlement of the Anglo-Saxons and Vikings. An Anglo-Saxon male from northern England who died between the seventh and tenth centuries was determined to have belonged to haplogroup I1.

Haplogroups E1b1b and J in Europe are regarded as markers of Neolithic movements from the Middle East to Southern Europe and likely to Northern Europe from there. These haplogroups are found most often in Southern Europe and North Africa. Both are rare in Northern Europe; E1b1b is found in 1% of Norwegian men, 1.5% of Scottish, 2% of English, 2.5% of Danish, 3% of Swedish and 5.5% of German. It reaches its peak in Europe in Kosovo at 47.5% and Greece at 30%.

=== Uncommon Y haplogroups ===
Geneticists have found that seven men with the surname Revis, which originates in Yorkshire, carry a genetic signature previously found only in people of West African origin. All of the men belonged to Haplogroup A1a (M31), a subclade of Haplogroup A which geneticists believe originated in Eastern or Southern Africa. The men are not regarded as phenotypically African and there are no documents, anecdotal evidence or oral traditions suggesting that the Revis family has African ancestry. It has been conjectured that the presence of this haplogroup may date from the Roman era when both Africans and Romans of African descent are known to have settled in Britain. According to Bryan Sykes, "although the Romans ruled from AD 43 until 410, they left a tiny genetic footprint." The genetics of some visibly white (European) people in England suggests that they are "descended from north African, Middle Eastern and Roman clans".

Geneticists have shown that former American president Thomas Jefferson, who might have been of Welsh descent, along with two other British men out of 85 British men with the surname Jefferson, carry the rare Y chromosome marker T (formerly called K2). This is typically found in East Africa and the Middle East. Haplogroup T is extremely rare in Europe but phylogenetic network analysis of its Y-STR (short tandem repeat) haplotype shows that it is most closely related to an Egyptian T haplotype, but the presence of scattered and diverse European haplotypes within the network is nonetheless consistent with Jefferson's patrilineage belonging to an ancient and rare indigenous European type.

== The continuity model of British ancestry ==
The continuity model of British ancestry claims that the British gene pool was substantially unaltered from the Britain's original settlement in the late Stone Age with little substantial genetic contribution from subsequent migrations, including the arrival of the Anglo-Saxons. Although starting in the 1970s, in the mid 2000s it became a temporarily popular explanation for the state of understanding of British genetics with popular books like Stephen Oppenheimer's The Origins of the British and Bryan Sykes' book Blood of the Isles, arguing that the majority of Britain's population are genetically similar to the Basques.

This has been challenged sine the late 2000s with modern autosomal genetic clustering shows the British and Irish clustering genetically far more closely with other North European populations, rather than Iberians. Further, more recent whole genome research has broadly supported the idea that genetic differences between the English and the Welsh have origins in the settlement of the Anglo-Saxons rather than prehistoric migration events.

== See also ==
=== Britain ===
- Prehistoric Britain
- Historical immigration to Great Britain
- Anglo-Saxon settlement of Britain
- Nordic migration to Britain
- List of haplogroups of historical and famous figures

=== Elsewhere ===
- Genetic history of the Middle East
- Genetic history of indigenous peoples of the Americas
- Genetic history of Europe
- Genetic history of Italy
- Genetics and archaeogenetics of South Asia

== Bibliography ==
- Balaresque, P.; Bowden, G.R.; Adams, S.M.; Ho-Yee, L; King, King; Rosser, Z.H.; Goodwin, J.; Moisan, J.P.; Richard, C.; Millward, A.; Demaine, A.G.; Barbujani, G.; Prevderè, C.; Wilson, I.J.; Tyler-Smith, C.; Jobling, M.A. (2010). "A predominantly Neolithic origin for European paternal lineages". PLOS Biology. 8 (1) e1000285. doi:10.1371/journal.pbio.1000285. PMC 2799514. PMID 20087410.
- Bowden, G.; Balaresque, P.; King, T.E.; Hansen, Z.; Lee, A.C.; Pergl-Wilson, G.; Hurley, E.; Roberts, S.J.; Waite, S.J.; Jesch, J.; Jones, A.L.; Thomas, M.G.; Harding, S.E.; Jobling, M.A. (2008). "Excavating past population structures by surname-based sampling: the genetic legacy of the Vikings in northwest England". Molecular Biology and Evolution. 25 (2): 301–309. doi:10.1093/molbev/msm255. PMC 2628767. PMID 18032405.
- Cavalli-Sforza, L.L. (1997). "Genes, peoples and languages". Proceedings of the National Academy of Sciences of the United States of America. 94 (15): 7719–7724. Bibcode:1997PNAS...94.7719C. doi:10.1073/pnas.94.15.7719. PMC 33682. PMID 9223254.
- Cruciani, F.; La Fratta, R.; Trombetta, B.; Santolamazza, P.; Sellitto, D.; Beraud-Colomb, E.; Dugoujon, J.; Crivellaro, F.; Benincasa, T.; Pascone, R.; Moral, P.; Watson, E.; Melegh, B.; Barbujani, G.; Fuselli, S.; Vona, G.; Zagradisnik, B.; Assum, G.; Brdicka, R.; Kozlov, A.I.; Efremov, G.D.; Coppa, A.; Novelletto, A.; Scozzari, R. (2007). "Tracing past human male movements in northern/eastern Africa and western Eurasia: new clues from Y-chromosomal haplogroups E-M78 and J-M12". Molecular Biology and Evolution. 24 (6): 1300–1311. doi:10.1093/molbev/msm049. PMID 17351267.
- Cruciani, F.; Trombetta, B.; Antonelli, C.; Pascone, R.; Valesini, G.; Scalzi, V.; Vona, G.; Melegh, B.; Zagradisnik, B.; Assum, G.; Efremov, G.D.; Sellitto, D.; Scozzari, R. (2011). "Strong intra- and inter-continental differentiation revealed by Y chromosome SNPs M269, U106 and U152". Forensic Science International: Genetics. 5 (3): e49–e52. doi:10.1016/j.fsigen.2010.07.006. hdl:11573/226727. PMID 20732840.
- King, T.E.; Parkin, E.J.; Swinfield, G.; Cruciani, F.; Scozzari, R.; Rosa, A.; Lim, S.-K.; Xue, Y.; Tyler-Smith, C.; Jobling, M.A. (2007a). "Africans in Yorkshire? The deepest-rooting clade of the Y phylogeny within an English genealogy". European Journal of Human Genetics. 15 (3): 288–293. doi:10.1038/sj.ejhg.5201771. PMC 2590664. PMID 17245408.
- King, T.E.; Bowden, G.R.; Balaresque, P.L.; Adams, S.M.; Shanks, M.E.; Jobling, M.A. (2007b). "Thomas Jefferson's Y chromosome belongs to a rare European lineage". American Journal of Physical Anthropology. 132 (4): 584–589. Bibcode:2007AJPA..132..584K. doi:10.1002/ajpa.20557. PMID 17274013.
- Lao, O.; Lu, T.T.; Nothnagel, M.; Junge, O.; Freitag-Wolf, S.; Caliebe, A.; Balascakova, M.; Bertranpetit, J.; Bindoff, L.A.; Comas, D.; Holmlund, G.; Kouvatsi, A.; Macek, M.; Mollet, I.; Parson, W.; Palo, J.; Ploski, R.; Sajantila, A.; Tagliabracci, A.; Gether, U.; Werge, T.; Rivadeneira, F.; Hofman, A.; Uitterlinden, A.G.; Gieger, C.; Wichmann, H.; Rüther, A.; Schreiber, S.; Becker, C.; Nürnberg, P.; Nelson, M.R.; Krawczak, M.; Kayser, M. (2008). "Correlation between genetic and geographic structure in Europe". Current Biology. 18 (16): 1241–1248. Bibcode:2008CBio...18.1241L. doi:10.1016/j.cub.2008.07.049. PMID 18691889. S2CID 16945780.
- Myres, N.M.; Rootsi, S.; Lin, A.A.; Järve, M.; King, R.J.; Kutuev, I.; Cabrera, V.M.; Khusnutdinova, E.K.; Pshenichnov, A.; Yunusbayev, B.; Balanovsky, O.; Balanovska, E.; Rudan, P.; Baldovic, M.; Herrera, R.J.; Chiaroni, J.; Di Cristofaro, J.; Villems, R.; Kivisild, T.; Underhill, P.A. (2011). "A major Y-chromosome haplogroup R1b Holocene effect in Central and Western Europe". European Journal of Human Genetics. 19 (1): 95–101. doi:10.1038/ejhg.2010.146. PMC 3039512. PMID 20736979.
- Novembre, J.; Johnson, T.; Bryc, K.; Kutalik, Z.; Boyko, A.R.; Auton, A.; Indap, A.; King, K.S.; Bergmann, S.; Nelson, M.R.; Stephens, M.; Bustamante, C.D. (2008). "Genes mirror geography within Europe". Nature. 456 (7218): 98–101. Bibcode:2008Natur.456...98N. doi:10.1038/nature07331. PMC 2735096. PMID 18758442.
- Olalde, I.; Brace, S.; Allentoft, M.E.; Armit, I.; Kristiansen, K.; Rohland, N.; Mallick, S.; Booth, T.; Szécsényi-Nagy, A.; Mittnik, A.; Altena, E.; Lipson, M.; Lazaridis, I.; Patterson, N.J.; Broomandkhoshbacht, N.; Diekmann, Y.; Faltyskova, Z.; Fernandes, D.M.; Ferry, M.; Harney, E.; de Knijff, P.; Michel, M.; Oppenheimer, J.; Stewardson, K.; Barclay, A.; Alt, K.W.; Avilés Fernández, A.; Bánffy, E.; Bernabò-Brea, M.; et al. (2018). "The Beaker phenomenon and the genomic transformation of northwest Europe". Nature. 555 (7695): 190–196. Bibcode:2018Natur.555..190O. doi:10.1038/nature25738. PMC 5973796. PMID 29466337.
- Oppenheimer, S. (2006). The Origins of the British: a Genetic Detective Story. Constable and Robinson. ISBN 978-1-84529-158-7.
- Sykes, B. (2006). The Blood of the Isles. Bantam Press. ISBN 978-0-593-05652-3.
- Walsh, S.; Chaitanya, L.; Breslin, K.; Muralidharan, C.; Bronikowska, A.; Pospiech, E.; Koller, J.; Kovatsi, L.; Wollstein, A.; Branicki, W.; Fan, L; Kayser, M. (2017). "Global skin colour prediction from DNA". Human Genetics. 136 (7): 847–863. doi:10.1007/s00439-017-1808-5. PMC 5487854. PMID 28500464.
