= Clare Griffiths =

Clare Griffiths may refer to:

- Clare Griffiths (basketball)
- Clare Griffiths (historian)
- Clare Griffiths (statistician)
