= Manchester High School for Girls =

Location
- Grangethorpe Road; Manchester, M14 6HS; England; 53°26′49″N 02°13′17″W

Information
- Type: Private day school
- Motto: Empowering Girls since 1874
- Religious affiliation: Mixed
- Established: 1874
- Local authority: Manchester
- Department for Education URN: 105592 Tables
- Head mistress: Helen F Jeys
- Gender: Girls
- Age: 4 to 18
- Enrolment: c. 980
- Logo: Ivy leaf
- Website: manchesterhigh.co.uk

Manchester High School for Girls is an English private day school for girls and a member of the Girls School Association. It is situated in Fallowfield, Manchester.

The head mistress is Helen Jeys who took up the position in September 2020 and is the 11th head mistress in the school's history.

== History ==
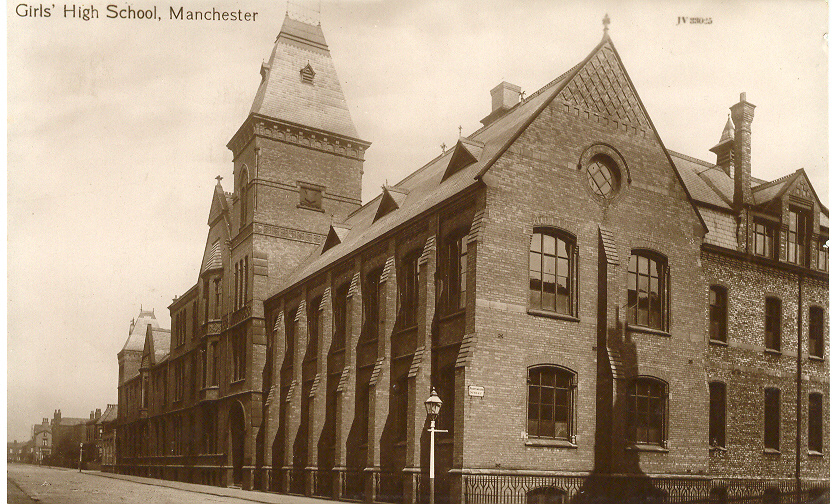
The Manchester High School for Girls, Dover Street (since 1947 part of the Victoria University of Manchester)

The school was founded in 1874 by nine men and women who were prominent citizens of Manchester: it was first established in Chorlton on Medlock. A new school was built in Dover Street in 1881. (The building is now occupied by the University of Manchester School of Chemistry.) The founding group included Augustus Samuel Wilkins, Harriet and Robert Dukinfield Darbishire, and Edward Donner (afterwards Sir Edward Donner, 1st Baronet.) The first headmistress was Elizabeth Day. Day was replaced as head by Sara Annie Burstall in 1898.

In September 1939 the school was evacuated to Cheadle Hulme and by 1940 a new school building was under construction at Fallowfield. The unfinished buildings at the Grangethorpe Road site were destroyed by bombing on 20 December 1940. In 1941 the school moved temporarily to Didsbury and by 1949 a new building at Grangethorpe Road began to be occupied. The move into the new school was complete by 1952. The Grangethorpe site was occupied by a large private house and gardens from 1882 to 1936.

== Preparatory department and senior school ==
Manchester High School for Girls has a preparatory department for girls aged 4 to 11 with the majority progressing into the senior school. Prep pupils have an infant section, two assembly halls and a playground and gardens. There are also specially designated areas for mathematics and science, a music room, library and two computer-suites providing multi-media facilities. In 2006, the school introduced the teaching of Mandarin to girls in years 3 and 4.

Manchester High's curriculum includes traditional disciplines such as Latin. Pupils are also tutored in areas such as mathematics, sciences and art and design technology. MHSG is a multi-cultural school embracing many faiths. Assemblies are organised by sixth form students and include Christian, Hindu and Sikh, Humanist, Jewish, Muslim and Secular themes.

A purpose-built music house has 12 practice rooms and several classrooms, including one with space for orchestra rehearsals. A floodlit, all-weather hockey pitch, tennis courts, netball courts, a rock-climbing wall, and a swimming pool provide facilities for year-around sports.

== Former staff ==
- Edith Aitken, the first head of Pretoria High School for Girls
- Sara Annie Burstall, the second headmistress of the school
- Catherine Chisholm (1879–1952), Manchester High School doctor: 1908 – 1944, GP and paediatrician: the first woman to graduate from Manchester University Medical School in 1904, founder of the Manchester Babies Hospital [later the Duchess of York Hospital] in 1914, in 1950 became the first woman to be awarded an honorary fellowship by the Royal College of Physicians.

== Gallery ==
Manchester High School for Girls

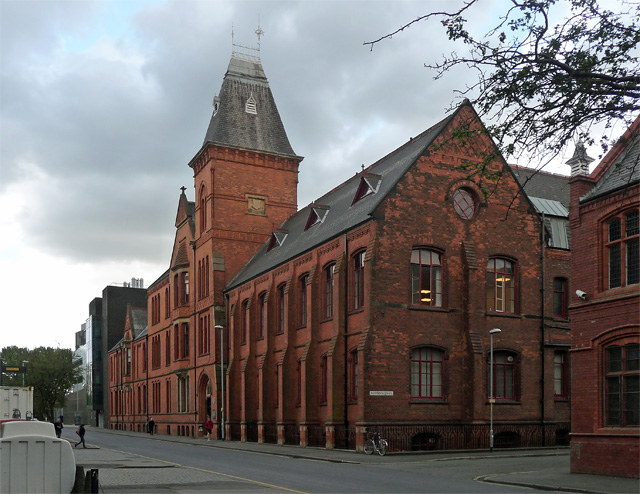
Former buildings, Dover Street

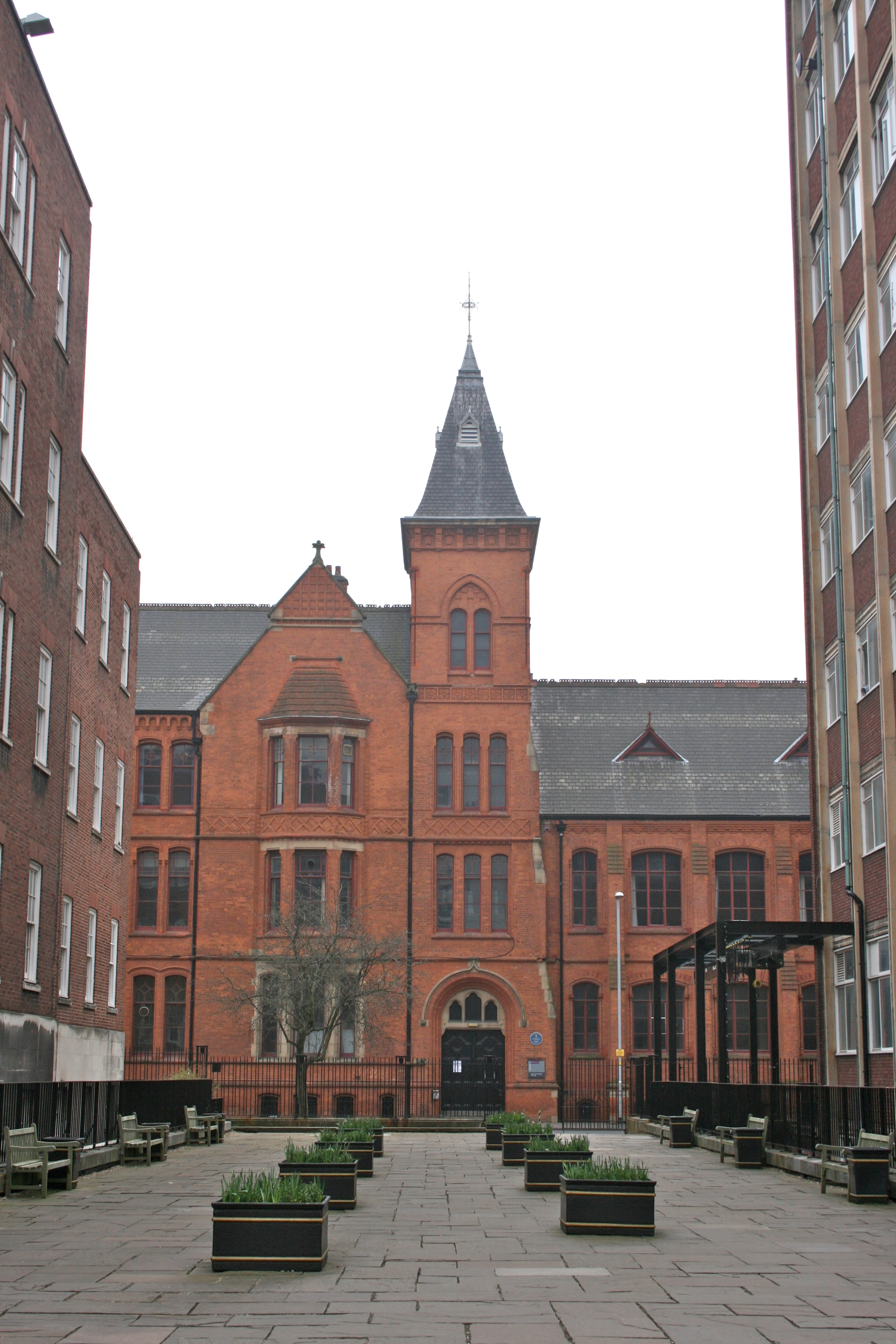
Former building, Dover Street

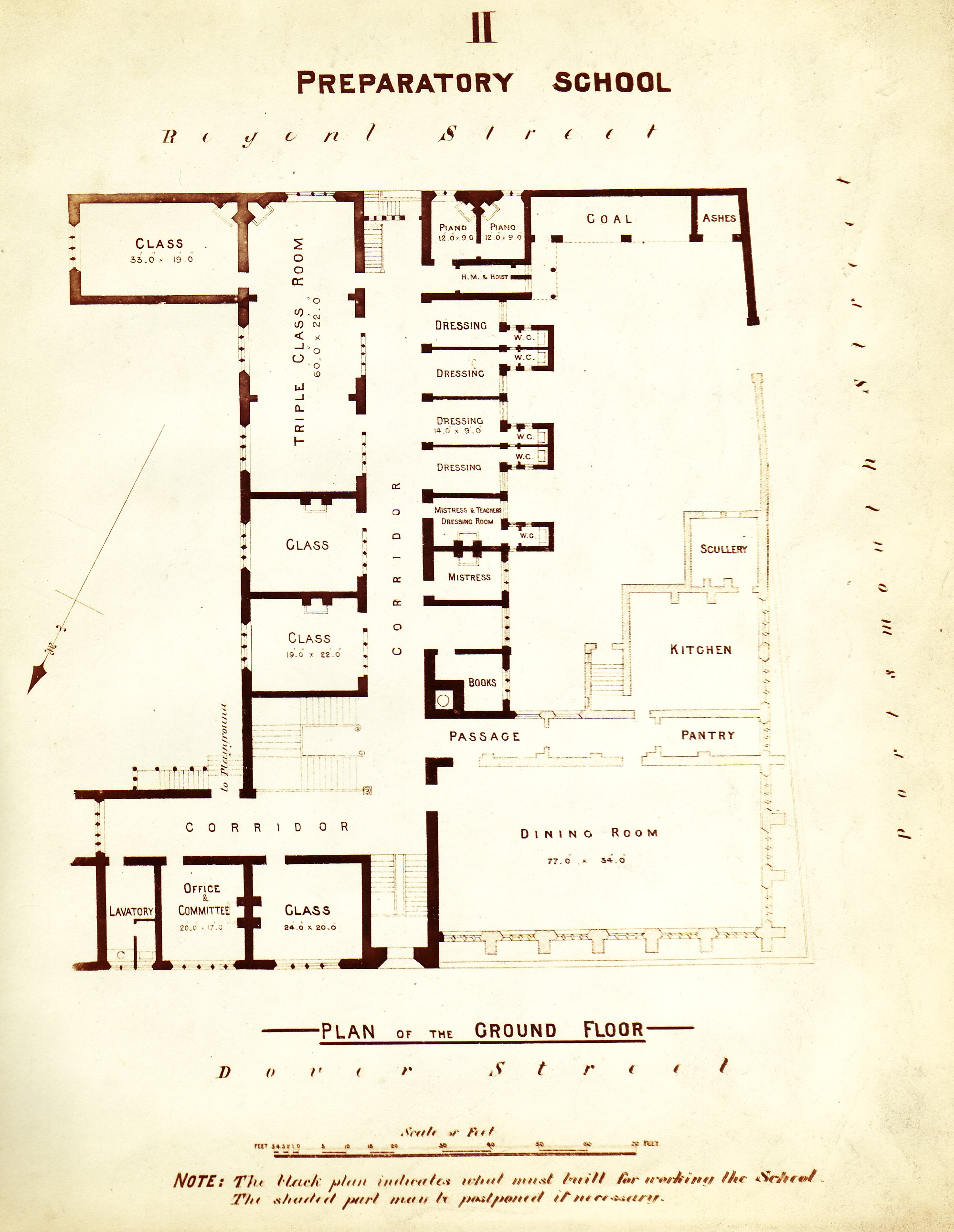
Dover Street

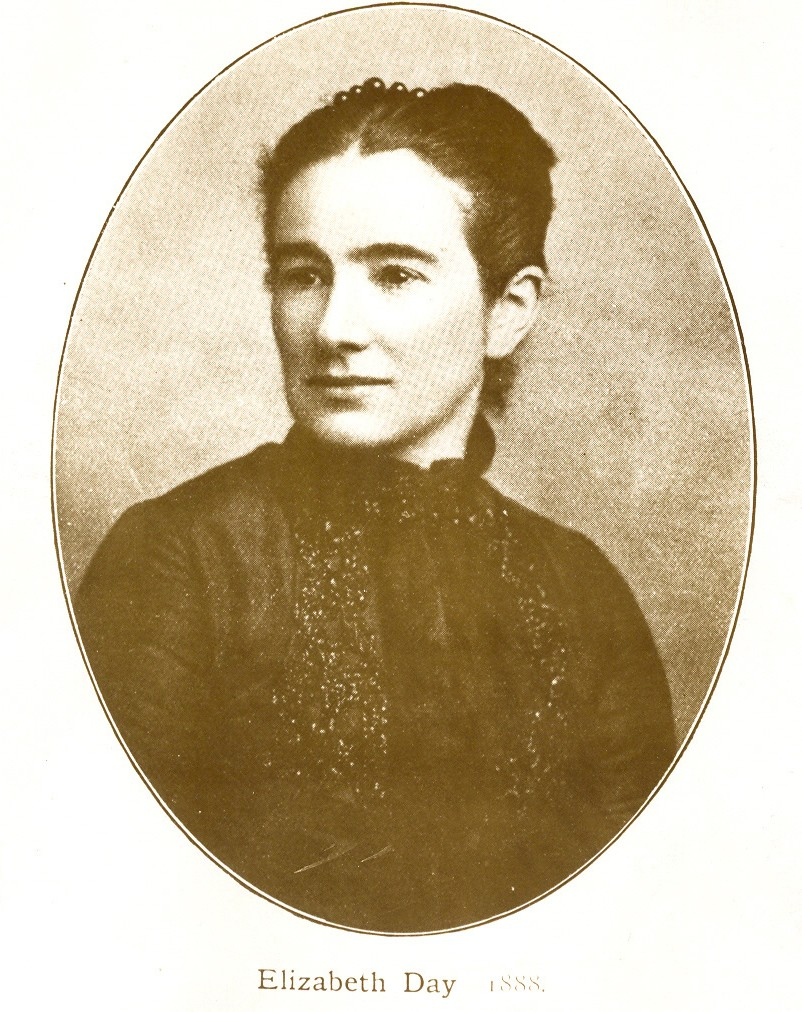
Elizabeth Day

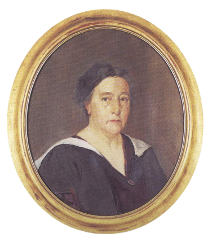
Edith Aitkin

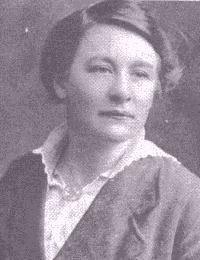
Adela Pankhurst

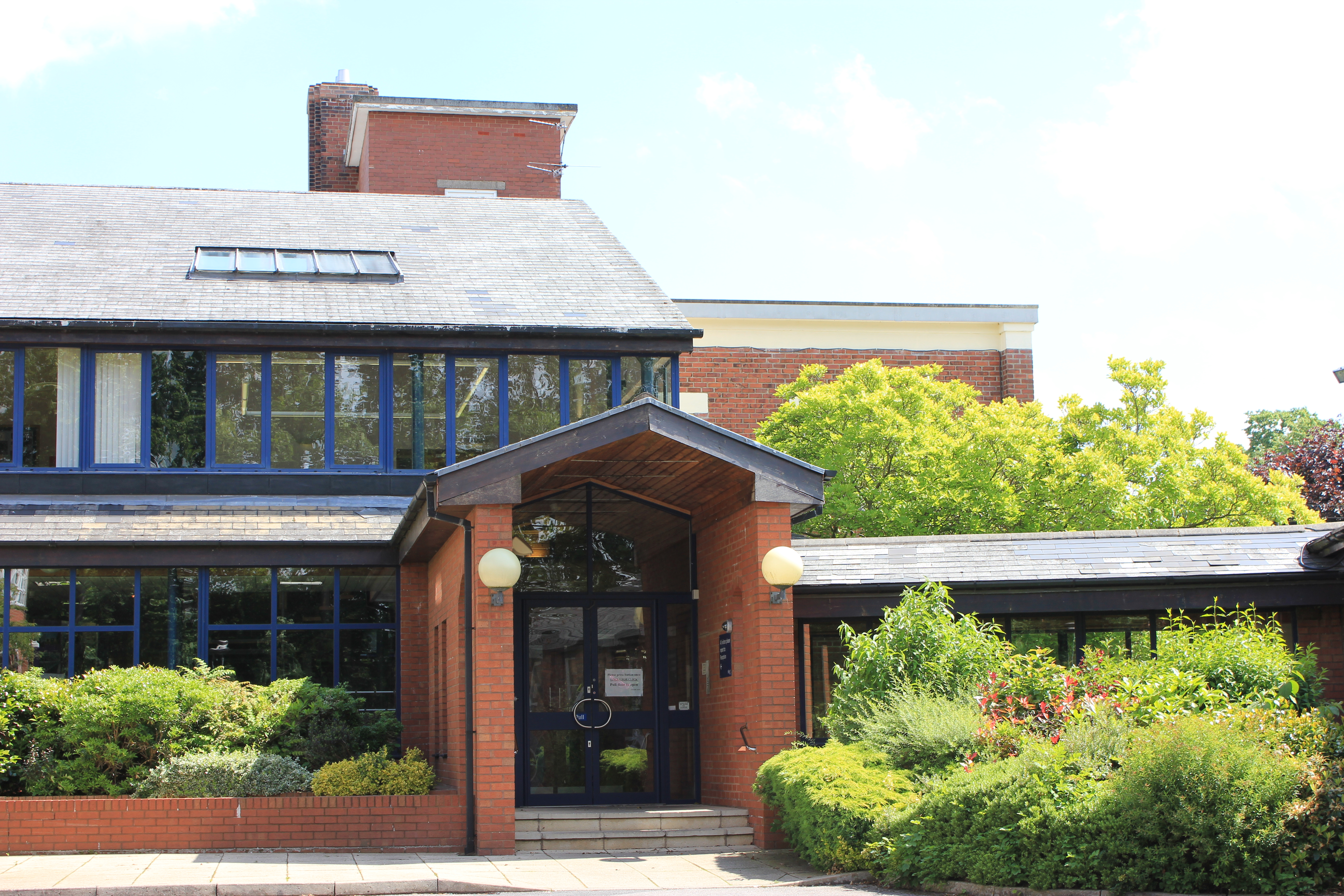
Front entrance

== Notable former pupils ==
- Isobel Baillie, classical soprano
- Anushka Asthana, journalist, television presenter and author
- Emma Barnett, broadcaster and journalist
- Jenny Campbell, multi-millionaire entrepreneur
- Ida Carroll, composer, double bass player, music educator, and university administrator
- Julia Bodmer, née Pilkington, Manchester High School pupil: 1945 – 1953, discovered the details of the Human leukocyte antigen (HLA) with genetic differences causing transplant rejection, and was married to Sir Walter Bodmer, who was the first Professor of Genetics at the University of Oxford, Chancellor of the University of Salford from 1995 to 2005 and Principal from 1996 to 2005 of Hertford College, Oxford
- Myrella Cohen, Manchester High School pupil: 1937 – 1940, was called to the bar in 1950, became Britain's third female judge in 1972, was appointed to the Central Criminal Court at the Old Bailey.
- Eileen Derbyshire, Manchester High School pupil: 1943, actress, played Emily Bishop in the television soap, Coronation Street
- Louise Ellman, Labour MP since 1997 for Liverpool Riverside
- Judy Finnigan, journalist and television presenter
- Alexandra Gajda, historian
- Clare Griffiths (statistician), head of the UK COVID-19 dashboard at the UK Health Security Agency.
- Kathleen Hale, Manchester High School pupil: 1913 – 1917, artist and children's author, best remembered for the Orlando the Marmalade Cat series, was awarded the OBE for services to literature in 1976.
- Sally Hamwee, Baroness Hamwee, president from 1995 to 2002 of the Town and Country Planning Association, and former chairman of the London Assembly until 2008
- Mollie Hardwick, née Greenhalgh, Manchester High School pupil: 1930 – 1934, was one of the first women announcers on BBC radio in the 1940s, writer and scriptwriter of TV series, e.g. "Upstairs and Downstairs" and "The Duchess of Duke Street," with her husband she set up a theatre company, the Hardwick Players.
- Vivienne Harris, née Hytner, Manchester High School pupil: 1933 – 1938, founder of the Jewish Telegraph, Manchester Evening News Female Executive of the Year, awarded the MBE for services to the community and to journalism.
- Hilda Johnstone, historian
- Dorothy Lamb, archaeologist
- Libby Lane, first female Church of England bishop
- Sunny Lowry, Manchester High School pupil: 1923 – 1927, in 1933 was one of the first British women to swim the English Channel, President of the Channel Swimmers' Association.
- Merlyn Lowther, the first woman Chief Cashier of the Bank of England from 1999 to 2003
- Adela Pankhurst, Manchester High School pupil: 1893 – 1902, campaigner in the Australian suffragette movement
- Christabel Pankhurst, Manchester High School pupil: 1893 – 1897, first woman to be awarded an LLB degree by Manchester University, founder member of the Women's Social and Political Union and leading campaigner in the British suffragette movement.
- Sylvia Pankhurst, Manchester High School pupil: 1893 – 1898, leading campaigner in the British suffragette movement
- Jasmin Paris, fell runner and ultra runner, vet.
- Vanessa Rosenthal, actress and playwright
- Dorothy Smith electrical engineer, worked for the engineering firm Metropolitan-Vickers, second woman to gain Full Membership of the Institution of Electrical Engineers.
- Clare Venables, theatre director
- Paula Vennells, disgraced, former chief executive officer of the Post Office
- Julia Yeomans, professor of physics at Oxford University

== See also ==
- Hulme Trust
