= Stephen Oppenheimer =

British geneticist

Stephen Oppenheimer (born 1947) is a British paediatrician, geneticist, and writer. He is a graduate of Balliol College, Oxford and an honorary fellow of the Liverpool School of Tropical Medicine. In addition to his work in medicine and tropical diseases, he has published popular works in the fields of genetics and human prehistory. This latter work has been the subject of a number of television and film projects.

== Career ==
Oppenheimer trained in medicine at Oxford and London universities, qualifying in 1971. From 1972 he worked as a clinical paediatrician, mainly in Malaysia, Nepal and Papua New Guinea. He carried out and published clinical research in the areas of nutrition, infectious disease (including malaria), and genetics, focussing on the interactions between nutrition, genetics and infection, in particular iron nutrition, thalassaemia and malaria. From 1979 he moved into medical research and teaching, with positions at the Liverpool School of Tropical Medicine, Oxford University, a research centre in Kilifi, Kenya, and the Universiti Sains Malaysia in Penang.

He spent three years undertaking fieldwork in Papua New Guinea, studying the effects of iron supplementation on susceptibility to infection. His fieldwork, published in the late 1980s, identified the role of genetic mutation in malarious areas as a result of natural selection due to its protective effect against malaria, and that different genotypes for alpha-thalassaemia traced different migrations out to the Pacific. Following that work, he concentrated on researching the use of unique genetic mutations as markers of ancient migrations.

From 1990 to 1994 Oppenheimer served as chairman and chief of clinical service in the Department of Paediatrics in the Chinese University of Hong Kong. He worked as senior specialist paediatrician in Brunei from 1994 to 1996. He returned to England in 1997, writing the book Eden in the East: the drowned continent of Southeast Asia, published in 1998. The book synthesised work across a range of disciplines, including oceanography, archaeology, linguistics, social anthropology and human genetics.

He continued to write books and articles, and began a second career as a researcher and popular-science writer on human prehistory. He worked as consultant on two television documentary series, The Real Eve (Discovery Channel) and Out of Eden (Channel 4), and published a second book, Out of Eden: the Peopling of the World (retitled The Real Eve in USA). This was followed in 2006 by The Origins of the British: a genetic detective story, on the post-glacial peopling of Great Britain and Ireland. In 2009 he was consultant on the BBC TV series The Incredible Human Journey.

== Books by Oppenheimer ==
- Eden in the East. 1999, Phoenix (Orion) ISBN 0-7538-0679-7
- Out of Eden. 2004, Constable and Robinson ISBN 1-84119-894-3 UK title of The Real Eve.
  - The Real Eve. Carroll & Graf; (9 September 2004) ISBN 0-7867-1334-8 US title of Out of Eden.
- The Origins of the British – A Genetic Detective Story. 2006, Constable and Robinson. ISBN 1-84529-158-1. (Paperback, 2007, Constable & Robinson. ISBN 978-1-84529-482-3).

=== Eden in the East ===
In his book Eden in the East: The Drowned Continent of Southeast Asia, published in 1998, Oppenheimer argues that the rise in ocean levels that accompanied the waning of the ice age—as much as 500 feet (150 m)—during the period 14,000–7,000 years ago, must be taken into account when trying to understand the flow of genes and culture in Eurasia. Citing evidence from geology, archaeology, genetics, linguistics, and folklore, he hypothesizes that the Southeast Asian subcontinent of Sundaland was home to a rich and original culture that was dispersed when Sundaland was mostly submerged and its population moved westward. According to Oppenheimer, Sundaland's culture may have reached India and Mesopotamia, becoming the root for the innovative cultures that developed in those areas. He also suggests that the Austronesian languages originate from Sundaland and that a Neolithic Revolution may have started there.

=== The Real Eve (documentary and US book title) / Out of Eden (UK book title) ===
In 2002, Oppenheimer worked as consultant on a television documentary series, The Real Eve, produced by the American cable TV network the Discovery Channel and directed by Andrew Piddington. The series was known as Where We Came From in the United Kingdom. The "Eve" in the title refers to Mitochondrial Eve, a name used for the most recent common ancestor of all humans in the matrilineal (mother to daughter) line of descent.

Following the series, Oppenheimer published a book on the same theme, originally titled Out of Eden in the UK and republished as The Real Eve in the US. This work, published in 2004, focuses on Oppenheimer's hypothesis: that approximately 85 thousand years ago, a group of modern humans migrated from East Africa across the Red Sea to South Asia in a single major exodus numbering no more than a few hundred individuals. This lone group of wanderers, he suggests, were the ancestors of all the peoples of the earth except sub-Saharan Africans, their descendants having since migrated all over the Eurasian continent, North Africa, the Pacific islands, and the New World, and radiated into a plurality of physical characteristics, languages, ethnicities and cultures as seen today.

=== Origins of the British ===
In his 2006 book The Origins of the British (revised in 2007), Oppenheimer argued that neither Anglo-Saxons nor Celts had much impact on the genetics of the inhabitants of the British Isles, instead he argued for a substantial continuity of British ancestry mainly traced back to Palaeolithic Iberian people, now represented best by Basques. He also argued that the Scandinavian input has been underestimated. He published an introduction to his book in Prospect magazine and answered some of his critics in a further Prospect magazine article in June 2007.

He reviewed early Y chromosome studies carried out by Michael Weale and Cristian Capelli and suggested that correlations of gene frequency mean nothing without a knowledge of the genetic prehistory of the regions in question. His criticism of these studies is that they generated models based on the historical evidence of Gildas and Procopius, and then selected methodologies to test against these populations. Weale's transect spotlights that Belgium is further west in the genetic map than North Walsham, Asbourne and Friesland. In Oppenheimer's view, this is evidence that the Belgae and other continental people – and hence continental genetic markers indistinguishable from those ascribed to Anglo-Saxons – arrived earlier and were already strong in the 5th century in particular regions or areas. Oppenheimer, basing his research on the Weale and Capelli studies, maintains that none of the invasions following the Romans have had a significant impact on the gene pool of the British Isles, and that the inhabitants from prehistoric times belong to an Iberian genetic grouping. He says that most people in the British Isles are genetically similar to the Basque people of northern Spain and southwestern France, from 90% in Wales to 66% in East Anglia. Oppenheimer suggests that the division between the West and the East of England is not due to the Anglo-Saxon invasion but originates with two main routes of genetic flow – one up the Atlantic coast, the other from neighbouring areas of Continental Europe – which occurred just after the Last Glacial Maximum. Bryan Sykes, a former geneticist at Oxford University, came to fairly similar conclusions as Oppenheimer.

Recent archaeogenetics studies have contradicted Oppenheimer's theory, indicating a population replacement in Britain by a migration of Early European Farmers, ultimately from the Aegean, after c. 4,000 BCE, and another population replacement around the middle of the third millennium BCE, when a migration of Bell Beaker groups carrying significant levels of Steppe Ancestry resulted in the replacement of around 90% of the gene pool in Britain.

== See also ==
- James Burnett, Lord Monboddo, earliest philosopher to formulate the one-source theory
- Jared Diamond
- Robert A. Foley
- Toomas Kivisild
- Luigi Luca Cavalli-Sforza
- Chris Stringer
