= Myrella Cohen =

British barrister

Myrella Cohen, QC (16 December 1927 – 25 October 2002) was a British barrister and circuit judge. She was the third female judge and the fifth female Queen's Counsel in the United Kingdom.

She was born into a Jewish family in Manchester in 1927. Her parents, Sam and Sarah Cohen, wanted to name her after their mothers, who were called Myra and Ella, so they came up with the combination of Myrella. She was educated at Manchester High School for Girls and Colwyn Bay Grammar School and then read law at Manchester University. She married Lt. Col. Mordaunt Cohen MBE TD DL, a decorated Burma veteran, whose surname was the same as her own. Her oldest Grandson Saul Taylor is the current President of the United Synagogue.

== Career ==
Cohen went on to become one of the first female judges and QCs in the UK, who was a pioneer for women in the legal profession. In 1970 she became the 5th women in the UK to be appointed a QC. At the age of 44 she became the youngest judge in the UK at that time. She presided over numerous high-profile cases at many courts in both Newcastle and London, including the Old Bailey and as resident Judge in Harrow. In 1992 she became the first person to receive an honorary doctorate in law from the University of Sunderland. In 2001 she starred as the Judge in the TV programme 'Trial by Jury'. She was a Soroptimist and a member of SI Sunderland.

== Communal life ==
Cohen was very active in the Jewish community as President of the international association of Jewish lawyers and jurors. She led the campaign in the UK for agunot (Jewish women whose husbands will not allow them to remarry). This campaign took over 10 years, and in 2001 she successfully pushed a law through Parliament, the Divorce (Religious Marriages) Bill, making it a lot harder for husbands to withhold a divorce (get) from their wives. The bill was given Royal Assent in August 2002. She died two months later, in October 2002, and was buried at the Har Hamenuchot cemetery in Jerusalem. A new road in Sunderland, called Myrella Crescent, was named in honour.
