= Mordaunt Cohen =

Jewish soldier and solicitor (1916-2019)

MBE TD Mordaunt Cohen
- Born: 6 August 1916; Sunderland, England
- Died: 16 March 2019 (aged 102)
- Allegiance: United Kingdom
- branch: Royal Regiment of Artillery, Territorial Army
- Rank: Lieutenant-Colonel
- Spouse: Myrella Cohen

Mordaunt Cohen MBE, TD (6 August 1916 – 16 March 2019) was a British soldier and solicitor.

== Early life ==
Mordaunt Cohen was born in Sunderland, England on 6 August 1916 and was educated at the Bede Collegiate School. He qualified as a solicitor at twenty-one and set up his own practice the following year.

== War Service ==
Cohen volunteered for service during World War II in 1940 and was commissioned into the Royal Artillery as a 2nd Lt (212456), on 4 October 1941, where he served in the Anti-Aircraft (AA) branch. His unit, 251 Heavy Anti-Aircraft (HAA) Battery, was posted to West Africa Command. There he commanded Nigerian troops, including Muslims, of the West African Artillery (WAA). In West Africa, he learned Hausa - the lingua franca for Nigerian troops - and trained his men for active service. In Burma, he led them in the fight against the Japanese. At the end of the war his service was recognised with the award of a Mention in Despatches.

After the war, Cohen transferred to the Territorial Army and continued his military service. In 1954, by now a Major, he received the Territorial Decoration. He retired as a Lieutenant-Colonel.

== Career ==
On his demobilisation, Cohen re-established his legal practice. His core work was in industrial relations, representing trade union, but later he became a full-time chair of industrial tribunals. In 1969, he was involved in the foundation of Sunderland Polytechnic and became the first chairman of the Board of Governors, supporting the Rector Dr. Maurice Hutton. In 1992, the institution was, in turn, among the first polytechnics to gain university status. Cohen was an Orthodox Jew. He was a member, and later chairman, of the Association of Jewish ex-Service Men. As a centenarian, he remained active in educating future generations about the Second World War, and in 2017 he was awarded an MBE for this work.

== Family life ==
In 1953, Mordaunt married Myrella (Note: The Times has his wife's maiden name as Bloom but other sources give it as Cohen, like her husband.). The couple had two children. Mrs. Cohen was known professionally as: Her Honour Myrella Cohen, QC and was a distinguished figure in her own right. The Cohens were the first British couple to hold simultaneous, full-time judicial positions. Cohen was widowed in 2002 and died himself on 16 March 2019, at the age of 102.
