= Bryan Sykes =

British geneticist and science writer (1947–2020)

Bryan Clifford Sykes
- Born: 9 September 1947; London, England, United Kingdom
- Died: 10 December 2020 (aged 73)
- Education: Eltham College; University of Liverpool (BSc); University of Bristol (PhD)
- Known for: First research team to extract usable DNA from ancient bones; The Seven Daughters of Eve; Analyses of human mitochondrial and Y-chromosome data; Proof of Asian origins of Oceanian populations
- Scientific career
- Fields: Genetics
- Workplaces: Wolfson College, Oxford; University of Oxford (DSc)
- Academic advisors: Sir David Weatherall

Bryan Clifford Sykes (9 September 1947 – 10 December 2020) was a British geneticist, university professor, popular-science writer, and genetic genealogy company executive. He received a fellowship at Wolfson College and a personal chair, later emeritus professorship, in human genetics at the University of Oxford.

Sykes published the first report on retrieving DNA from ancient bone (Nature, 1989). He was involved in a number of high-profile archaeogenetics (ancient DNA) cases, including that of Ötzi the Iceman.

Sykes is best known outside the community of geneticists for his two most popular books – The Seven Daughters of Eve (2001), and Blood of the Isles / Saxons, Vikings and Celts (2006) – both on the investigation of human history and prehistory through studies of mitochondrial DNA (mtDNA). However, many of his conclusions in these works about European populations and their histories have become dubious or have been invalidated by more recent advances in whole-genome sequencing for more detailed archaeogenetics. He also suggested an American accountant named Tom Robinson was a direct descendant of Genghis Khan, a claim that was subsequently disproved.

Of more lasting significance, besides contributions to archaeogenetic technology, his mtDNA work in the Pacific demonstrated that the historical populating of Oceania took place entirely from Asia, dispelling a decades-persistent fringe theory of origins on the western coast of the Americas.

== Early life and education ==
Bryan Sykes was born 9 September 1947 in south-east London, to Frank (an accountant) and Irene Sykes.

Sykes was educated at Eltham College, received his BSc from the University of Liverpool, his PhD from the University of Bristol, and his DSc from the University of Oxford (to which he was admitted in 1973). Originally focusing on bone and connective-tissue disorders, in Oxford's orthopaedic surgery department, he did early work on collagen and elastin genetics.

== Career ==
Sykes became an Oxford lecturer in molecular pathology in 1987. Although much of his academic output remained focused on heritable skeletal disorders at the university's then-new Institute of Molecular Medicine, his genetic research broadened.

In 1989, Sykes published his research team's success in extracting intact genetic material (in the form of mtDNA) from bones up to 12,000 years old in the journal Nature. This marked a pivot from his medical-related work to the nascent archeological field of archaeogenetics. Other key participants in this team (coalescing through their work together at the John Radcliffe Hospital) were Erika Hagelberg and Robert E. M. Hedges of the Research Laboratory for Archaeology and the History of Art at the Oxford's School of Archaeology. Hedges later became a leading scholar of the molecular analysis of ancient diets and of archaeological environments, following his earlier roles in the development radiocarbon dating and then the application of accelerator mass spectrometry in archaeology. Hagelberg published, as Sykes would, on mtDNA's use in establishing prehistoric human population movements, and made high-profile strides in forensic analysis of degraded genetic samples.

Sykes received a personal-chair professorship in human genetics at Oxford in 1997.

From 1999 to 2016, he published a number of popularized-science books for a broad audience, to considerable attention (not all of it positive, especially from fellow academics). Starting with The Human Inheritance (1999), much of this material was focused on explaining the uses of genetics in understanding the history of human populations, especially in Europe (The Seven Daughters of Eve, 2001; Blood of the Isles, 2006) and North America (DNA USA, 2011). In more academic work, he turned his mtDNA lens on the Pacific and East Asia, though these efforts did not result in books.

He branched out into other subjects, including in Adam's Curse (2003) an examination of the men's infertility crisis (and fears of extinction of the human male) along with how this may relate to [stereo]typically male behaviors. In a somewhat tongue-in-cheek vein, he reported on his research teams' debunking of supposed biological evidence of "ape-men" such as Yeti and Bigfoot, in a three-part TV miniseries and two books, The Nature of the Beast (2015), and Bigfoot, Yeti, and the Last Neanderthal (2016).

Skyes retired from academia in 2016 as an emeritus professor, but continued his genetic-genealogy business pursuits, maintained a public and media presence, and published a final book, Once a Wolf (2019), on the prehistoric development of the wild wolf into the domestic dog.

=== The Seven Daughters of Eve ===
In 2001, Sykes published a book for the popular audience, The Seven Daughters of Eve: The Science That Reveals Our Genetic Ancestry, in which he explained how the dynamics of maternal mitochondrial DNA (mtDNA) inheritance leave their mark on the human population in the form of genetic "clans" sharing common maternal descent. He noted that the majority of Europeans can be classified into seven such groups, known scientifically as haplogroups, distinguishable by differences in their mtDNA that are unique to each group, with each descending from a separate prehistoric female-line ancestor. He referred to these seven "clan mothers" as "daughters of Eve", a reference to the mitochondrial Eve to whom the mtDNA of all modern humans traces.

Based on the geographical and ethnological distribution of the modern descendants of each clan, he assigned provisional homelands for the seven clan mothers, and used the degree to which each clan diverges to approximate the time period when the clan mother would have lived. He then used these deductions to give fictional but research-based "biographies" for each of the clan mothers, assigning them arbitrary names based on the scientific designation of their haplogroup (for example, using the name Xenia for the founder of haplogroup X).

=== Blood of the Isles ===
In his 2006 book Blood of the Isles: Exploring the Genetic Roots of Our Tribal History (published in the United States and Canada as Saxons, Vikings and Celts: The Genetic Roots of Britain and Ireland), Sykes examined purported ancestral genetic "clans" of the British Isles. He presented evidence from both mitochondrial DNA, inherited by both sexes only from their mothers, and the Y chromosome, inherited by men only, from their fathers. In this work, he made the following claims (among others):

- The genetic makeup of Britain and Ireland is overwhelmingly what it has been since the Neolithic period and to a very considerable extent since the Mesolithic period, especially in the female line, i.e. those people, who in time would become identified as British Celts (culturally speaking), but who (genetically speaking) should more properly be called Cro-Magnon. In continental Europe, this same Cro-Magnon genetic legacy gave rise to the Basques. "Basque" and "Celt" are cultural designations, not genetic ones.
- The contribution of the Celts of Central Europe to the genetic makeup of Britain and Ireland was minimal; most of the genetic contribution to the British Isles of those we think of as Celtic, came from western continental Europe, i.e. the Atlantic seaboard.
- The Picts were not a separate people: the genetic makeup of the formerly Pictish areas of Scotland shows no significant differences from the general profile of the rest of Britain. The two "Pictland" regions are Tayside and Grampian.
- The Anglo-Saxons are supposed, by some, to have made a substantial contribution to the genetic makeup of England, but in Sykes's opinion it was under 20 per cent of the total, even in Southern England.
- The Vikings (Danes and Norwegians) made a substantial contribution, which is concentrated in central, northernm and eastern England – the territories of the early-medieval Danelaw. There is a very heavy Viking contribution in the Orkney and the Shetland Islands, around 40 per cent. Women as well as men contributed substantially in all these areas, showing that the Vikings engaged in large-scale settlement.
- The Norman contribution was extremely small, on the order of 2 per cent.
- There are only sparse genetic traces of the Roman occupation, almost all in Southern England.
- In spite of all these later contributions, the genetic makeup of the British Isles remains overwhelmingly what it was in the Neolithic: a mixture of the first Mesolithic inhabitants with Neolithic settlers who came by sea from Iberia and ultimately from the eastern Mediterranean.
- There is a difference between the genetic histories of men and women in Britain and Ireland. The matrilineages show a mixture of original Mesolithic inhabitants and later Neolithic arrivals from Iberia, whereas the patrilineages are much more strongly correlated with Iberia.
- There is evidence for a "Genghis Khan effect", whereby some male lineages in ancient times were much more successful than others in leaving large numbers of descendants; e.g. Niall of the Nine Hostages in 4th- and 5th-century Ireland, and Somerled in 12th-century Scotland.

==== Modern evidence ====
With the advent of whole-genome sequencing and more complete analysis of ancient DNA, many of Sykes's theories regarding the origins of the British have been largely invalidated. A 2018 study argues that over 90% of the DNA of the Neolithic population of Britain was overturned by a North European Bell Beaker population, originating in the Pontic–Caspian steppe, as part of a long-term migration process that brought large amounts of Steppe DNA (including the R1b haplogroup) to North and West Europe. Modern autosomal genetic clustering is testament to this fact, as both modern and Iron Age British and Irish samples cluster genetically very closely with other North European populations, rather than Iberians, Galicians, Basques, or those from the south of France. Similar studies have concluded that the Anglo-Saxons, while not replacing the previous populations outright, may have contributed more to the gene pool in much of England than Sykes had claimed.

=== Asian and Pacific genetics ===
Sykes used a similar approach to that in The Seven Daughters of Eve to identify nine ancient (Palaeolithic to Jōmon period) "clan mothers" of Japanese ancestry, "all different from the seven European equivalents". While this work garnered some brief press attention, it did not culminate in a book, and has not had a significant impact in academic circles.

More importantly, his Pacific mtDNA genetic sample collections and analyses in the 1990s demonstrated that Polynesia and the rest of Oceania were historically entirely populated from Asia, not (even in part) from the Americas. The latter idea – a notion of migration of people from South and Central American into the Pacifc, and extensive maritime trade between the regions – has never had solid evidence to support it, yet remained stubbornly popular in certain circles for over half a century, especially after being heavily promoted by adventurer Thor Heyerdahl from 1938 onward in books, films, and on television.

=== Hybrid-bear hypothesis for the legendary Yeti ===
Sykes and his team at Oxford University carried out DNA analysis of purported Yeti ("Abominable Snowman") tissue samples, and hypothesized they may have come from an inter-specific bear hybrid, produced from a mating between brown and polar bears. Sykes told BBC News:

I think this bear, which nobody has seen alive, may still be there and may have quite a lot of polar bear in it. It may be some sort of hybrid and if its behaviour is different from normal bears, which is what eyewitnesses report, then I think that may well be the source of the mystery and the source of the legend.

He conducted another similar survey in 2014, this time examining samples attributed not just to Yeti but also to Bigfoot and other "anomalous primates". The study concluded that two of the 30 samples tested most closely resembled the genome of a Palaeolithic polar bear, and that the other 28 were from living mammals.

The samples were subsequently re-analysed by Ceiridwen Edwards and Ross Barnett. They concluded that the mutation that had led to the match with a polar bear was a damaged artefact, and suggested that the two hair samples were in fact from Himalayan brown bears (U. arctos isabellinus). These bears are known in parts of Nepal as dzu-the (meaning 'cattle-bear'), and have been associated with the myth of the Yeti. Sykes and Melton acknowledged that their GenBank search was in error but suggested that the hairs were instead a match to a modern polar bear specimen "from the Diomede Islands in the Bering Sea reported in the same paper". They maintained that they did not see any sign of damage in their sequences and commented that they had "no reason to doubt the accuracy of these two sequences any more than the other 28 presented in the paper". Multiple further analyses, including replication of the single analysis conducted by Sykes and his team, were carried out in a study conducted by Eliécer E. Gutiérrez, a researcher at the Smithsonian Institution, and Ronald H. Pine, affiliated with the University of Kansas. All of these analyses found that the relevant genetic variation in brown bears makes it impossible to assign, with certainty, the Himalayan samples to either that species or to the polar bear. Because brown bears occur in the Himalayas, Gutiérrez and Pine stated that there is no reason to believe that the samples in question came from anything other than ordinary Himalayan brown bears.

Despite the cold academic reception, and the hypothesis not panning out, Sykes's idea was not on-its-face implausible, as brown × polar bear hybridization is well-documented elsewhere.

== Personal life ==
Sykes married Sue Foden, whom he met when she was a student in Oxford. They were married from 1978 to 1984, with the union ending in annulment, but they remained close, and their son was born in 1991. Sykes married a second time, to Janis Wilson; this ended in divorce. His partner and wife throughout his later years was Danish painter Ulla Plougmand; they began their relationship in 2007.

As a youth, Sykes had been active in distance running, swimming, and rugby. As an adult, he was an avid cyclist and fly angler. Also a keen croquet player, he represented Ireland in the 1984 Home Internationals.

Skyes was the founder and chairman of a now-defunct genetic genealogy company, Oxford Ancestors, operating 2001–2021. This has been claimed to be the first direct-to-consumer business of this sort, though this is difficult to ascertain since many such companies, in various countries, came and went.

Sykes died on 10 December 2020.

== Selected works ==
- Sykes, Bryan (1999). The Human Inheritance: Genes, Language, and Evolution. Oxford University Press. ISBN 978-0-19-850274-6.
- —— (2002). The Seven Daughters of Eve: The Science That Reveals Our Genetic Ancestry. Corgi Books. ISBN 978-0-552-14876-4.
- —— (2003). Adam's Curse: A Future Without Men. Bantam Books. ISBN 978-0-593-05004-0.
- —— (2006). Blood of the Isles: Exploring the Genetic Roots of Our Tribal History. Bantam. ISBN 978-0-593-05652-3. Published in North America as Saxons, Vikings, and Celts: The Genetic Roots of Britain and Ireland. W. W. Norton & Co. / Penguin Random House Canada. 2007. ISBN 978-0-393-33075-5.
- —— (2011). DNA USA: A Genetic Biography of America. W. W. Norton & Co. ISBN 978-0-393-07804-6.
- —— (2015). The Nature of the Beast: The First Scientific Evidence on the Survival of Apemen into Modern Times. Hodder & Stoughton. ISBN 978-1-444-79126-6.
- —— (2016). Bigfoot, Yeti, and the Last Neanderthal: A Geneticist's Search for Modern Apemen. Disinformation Books. ISBN 978-1-93887515-1.
- —— (2019). Once a Wolf: The Science Behind Our Dogs' Astonishing Genetic Evolution. Liveright Publishing. ISBN 978-1-63149-379-9.
