= Sara Annie Burstall =

British headmistress in Manchester

Sara Burstall
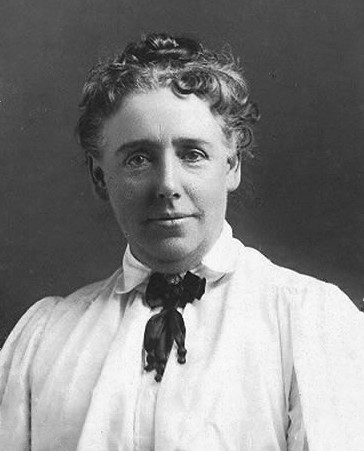
- in the 1890s
- Born: 2 November 1859; Aberdeen, Scotland, United Kingdom of Great Britain and Ireland
- Died: 26 March 1939 (aged 79); Fulham, London, England, United Kingdom
- Education: Girton College, Cambridge, University College London
- Employer: Manchester High School for Girls
- Predecessor: Elizabeth Day

Sara Annie Burstall (2 November 1859 – 26 March 1939) was a Scottish born writer on education and the second headmistress of the Manchester High School for Girls.

== Life ==
Burstall was born in Aberdeen in 1859. Her father, Henry, had a number of jobs until a legacy in the 1870s made the family financially secure. She was educated first by a governess, then at Dr Lyon's Union Street Scottish Academy in Aberdeen. After moving to London, she attended Camden School for Girls; and then won a scholarship in 1875 the North London Collegiate School, where she became head girl. (Both the latter schools had been founded by Frances Mary Buss, whose biography Burstall would publish in 1938.)

She took the University of London General Examination for Women in 1877, and won a scholarship to Girton College, Cambridge. As an assistant mistress at North London Collegiate School she attended classes at University College London (UCL), and took the Intermediate Arts exam in 1883, "from North London Collegiate School and Girton", and the BA in 1884 from UCL. She later obtained qualifications in Scripture (Hebrew Prize 1886) and Pedagogy (1894) from UCL.

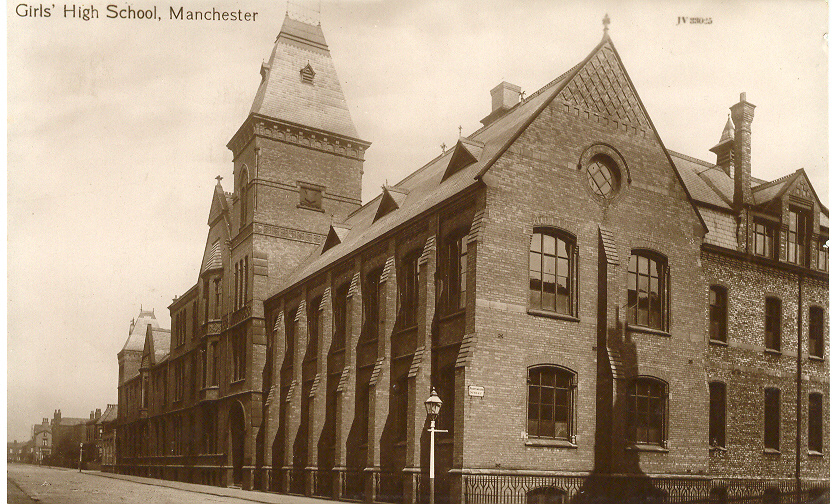
Manchester High School for Girls on Dover Street

In 1886, one of her tutors, Donald MacAlister, wrote: "I had the privilege of teaching Miss Sara A. Burstall during several terms of her residence in Girton College and have a very clear remembrance of the excellent qualities she showed as a student of mathematics. She possessed an unwearying power of work, a very keen appreciation of the refinements of the subject and a high enthusiasm for its study. These qualities of industry, intelligence and enthusiasm will, I am sure, stand her in good stead should she be called, as I hope she may be, to take on the responsible position of headmistress."

In 1893 she travelled to the USA where she studied education and wrote her first book, The Education of Girls in the United States. In 1898 she took over as headmistress of Manchester High School for Girls. She was the second head, succeeding Elizabeth Day who had led the school since its founding in 1874. The building is now occupied by the University of Manchester School of Social Sciences.

Burstall's introduction of streamed education was considered controversial. The girls of lower ability were steered away from academic ambition and towards newly introduced domestic subjects. Burstall defended this approach as a way to attract more pupils and give access to girls who might otherwise be denied schooling – but it has been considered by some a step backwards from the partial educational equality that had been achieved. Nevertheless, she continued to lead the debate on girls' education. In 1903, she became one of three women members of the newly formed education committee of Manchester City Council, installing the first woman inspector of infant schools; and securing two of the four local authority university scholarships for women.

Burstall made a second trip to the USA and when she returned she published Impressions of American Education in 1908. In 1909, she was elected president of the Association of Headmistresses of Public Secondary Schools (AHM), serving until 1911. Burstall resigned from the MHSG headship in 1924. In May 1925, she was the first woman to be appointed to a Colonial Advisory Committee On Education, a position she held until 1938. She had also served as a magistrate for three years after retiring from the headship.

She died in Fulham, London, on 26 March 1939.

== Family ==
Burstall's brother, Prof. Henry Frederic Burstall, was head of the Mechanical Engineering Department at Birmingham University.

== Assessment ==
Burstall is widely regarded as a champion of both girls' education, and of the importance of teachers. "Parents have to realise that the teacher is an expert professional and is entitled therefore to the deference shown to the skilled professional opinion of the doctor, lawyer or architect", she wrote.

== Selected works ==
- 1894: The Education of Girls in the United States
- 1907: English High Schools for Girls: Their Aims, Organisation, and Management (BiblioBazaar, ISBN 978-1103083961)
- 1909: Impressions of American Education in 1908
- 1911: The Story of the Manchester High School for Girls: 1871–1911
- 1933: Retrospect & Prospect: sixty years of women's education
- 1938: Frances Mary Buss: an educational pioneer
