= John Maxwell Landers =

British historian, anthropologist and academic

John Landers FRHistS

Principal of Hertford College, Oxford
- In office 2005–2011
- Preceded by: Sir Walter Bodmer
- Succeeded by: Will Hutton

Personal details
- Born: John Maxwell Landers; 1952 (age 73–74)
- Education: Haberdashers' Aske's Boys' School; Southgate Technical College
- Alma mater: Hertford College, Oxford; Churchill College, Cambridge

John Maxwell Landers, FRHistS (born 1952) is a British historian, anthropologist, and academic, who specialises in historical demography. He was Principal of Hertford College, Oxford, from 2005 to September 2011.

== Early life and education ==
Landers was educated at Haberdashers' Aske's Boys' School, Elstree, Southgate Technical College, Hertford College, Oxford (BA Human Sciences, MA) and Churchill College, Cambridge (PhD, Some problems in the historical demography of London, 1675-1825, approved 13 November 1984). He is now a Doctor of Letters of the University of Oxford and a Fellow of the Royal Historical Society.

== Academic career ==
From 1980 until 1990 Landers was Lecturer in Biological Anthropology at University College London. From 1991 to 2005 he was University Lecturer in Historical Demography at the University of Oxford and a Fellow of All Souls College, Oxford, where he is now the external Chair of the college's Audit Committee. From 2005 to 2011 he was Principal of Hertford College, Oxford where he is now an Honorary Fellow. During the academic year 1994/95 he served as Assessor and he has formerly been a member of the Hebdomadal Council and the General Board at Oxford. In March 2013 he was appointed Chair of the Animals in Science Committee an independent expert advisory body which advises ministers on matters relating to animals protected under the Animals (Scientific Procedures) Act.

== Publications ==
Author

- John Landers, Death and the metropolis: studies in the demographic history of London 1670-1830 (Cambridge: Cambridge University Press, 1993)
- John Landers, The field and the forge: population, production, and power in the pre-industrial west (Oxford: Oxford University Press, 2003)

Editor

- John Landers, ed., Historical epidemiology and the health transition (Canberra: Health Transition Centre, National Centre for Epidemiology and Population Health, Australian National University, 1993)

Joint editor

- John Landers and Vernon Reynolds, eds, Fertility and resources (Thirty-first Symposium of the Society for the Study of Human Biology, University of Oxford, 1989, Cambridge: Cambridge University Press, 1990)

== Sources and further information ==
- Hertford College website, including a photograph of John Landers in the London Eye
- University of Oxford Annual Review 2004/05
- Oxford Blueprint: The newsletter of the University of Oxford 5:5 (13 January 2005)
- All Souls College, Oxford

Academic offices
Preceded by Walter Bodmer	Principal of Hertford College, Oxford; 2005–2011	Succeeded by Will Hutton
