= Julia Bodmer =

British geneticist (1934–2001)

- Julia Bodmer in 1998
- Born: Julia Gwynaeth Pilkington; 31 July 1934; Manchester, England
- Died: 29 January 2001 (aged 66)
- Education: Manchester High School for Girls; Lady Margaret Hall, Oxford
- Known for: Discovery and definition of the human leukocyte antigen
- Spouse: Walter Bodmer (m. 1956)
- Children: 3
- Scientific career
- Fields: Genetics, economics
- Workplaces: University of Cambridge; Stanford University; Genetics Laboratory, Oxford University; Tissue Antigen Laboratory at the Imperial Cancer Research Fund, London

Lady Julia Gwynaeth Bodmer (born Julia Pilkington; 31 July 1934 – 29 January 2001) was a British geneticist and trained economist. Involved in the discovery and definition of the human leukocyte antigen (HLA) system of genetic markers, Bodmer became one of the world's leading experts in HLA serology and the genetic definition of the HLA system. A prominent figure in the field of immunogenetics, her discoveries helped the understanding and development of knowledge about HLA associations with diseases including acquired immunodeficiency syndrome (AIDS) and cancer. As well as being a distinguished scientist in her own right, she collaborated throughout her career with her husband, the human and cancer geneticist Sir Walter Bodmer. The couple had three children.

== Early life and education ==
Born Julia Pilkington in Manchester, she was educated at Manchester High School for Girls where she became head prefect. She won a state scholarship to Lady Margaret Hall to read philosophy, politics and economics (PPE), specialising in economics and statistics. She met her future husband Walter Bodmer while they were both still at school and they married after graduation in 1956, after which she moved to Cambridge while he completed his doctorate.

== Career ==
From 1956-59, Bodmer held a position as statistical assistant to the economist W. B. Reddaway at the University of Cambridge. She then moved to Stanford with her husband and three young children in 1960, where she worked initially as a research assistant in the laboratory of the haematologist Dr. Rose Payne, and later in her husband's laboratory. With a strong statistical background and the ability to manage large and complex collections of data, Julia now moved to the field of HLA serology, collaborating with her husband and Payne. During this time, she worked on tissue typing and laid the basis for one of the first two genes of the HLA system.

In 1970, the family returned to England and Sir Walter took up the Chair of Genetics at Oxford University. Julia was appointed Research Officer in the Genetics Laboratory where she continued with her work on HLA disease associations and the population distribution of the HLA types. She was responsible for highlighting the association between HLA type and juvenile rheumatoid arthritis and ankylosing spondylitis in women, and helped establish the immunological basis of these diseases.

In 1979, the Bodmers moved to the Imperial Cancer Research Fund (ICRF) in London, where Sir Walter became Director. Julia had now established an international reputation, and now a professor she headed the Tissue Antigen Laboratory at the ICRF. During this period she was able to extend her work, making significant contributions to the genetics of Hodgkin's disease, Burkitt's lymphoma and testicular cancer. As a consequence of her work at the ICRF she was able to contribute to the identification of the first testicular cancer susceptibility gene. Upon retirement from the ICRF she returned to Oxford where her husband took up the appointment of Principal of Hertford College. The Bodmers jointly founded a new laboratory at the Institute of Molecular Medicine where they worked on genetic variation in human populations.

Among her many professional activities, Bodmer served on various committees, including Chair (1992) of the Histocompatibility and Immunogenetics Group of which she was a founder, and Secretary then President (1996–97) of the European Foundation for Immunogenetics (EFI). She also played an active role in the World Health Organization (WHO) Nomenclature Committee. She also spent time encouraging and welcoming new scientists to the field of Immunogenetics in her labs both in London at the ICRF, and later in Oxford.
