= The Real Eve =

2003 book by Stephen Oppenheimer

The Real Eve: Modern Man's Journey Out of Africa
- Author: Stephen Oppenheimer
- Language: English
- Subject: Human evolutionary genetics
- Publisher: Basic Books
- Publication date: 2003, 2004
- Publication place: United States, United Kingdom
- Media type: Documentary
- ISBN: 0-7867-1192-2

The Real Eve: Modern Man's Journey Out of Africa is a popular science book about the evolution of modern humans written by British geneticist Stephen Oppenheimer.

The book is largely based on the "out of Africa" theory of human origins. Oppenheimer uses information from various disciplines including genetics, archaeology, anthropology and linguistics to synthesize theories on the origin of modern humans and their subsequent dispersal around the world.

The Eve in the title refers to Mitochondrial Eve, a name used for the most recent common ancestor of all humans in the matrilineal (mother to daughter) line of descent.

== Book ==
The book was initially published under a number of different titles including Out of Africa's Eden: the peopling of the world in January 2003, and The Real Eve: Modern Man's Journey Out of Africa in June 2003.

=== Synopsis ===
In the book, Oppenheimer supports the theory that modern humans first emerged in Africa and that modern human behavior emerged in Africa prior to the out of Africa migration.

Oppenheimer writes that there was only one migration out of Africa that contributed to the peopling of the rest of the world. Oppenheimer believes that anatomically modern humans crossed the Red Sea from the Horn of Africa and followed the "southern coastal route" once in Asia. Thus Oppenheimer is opposed to the theory that there was another out of Africa migration using a northern route along the Nile and into the Levant as suggested by Lahr and Foley 1994. The book also supports the theory that modern humans were in South Asia during the Toba catastrophe.

Oppenheimer uses familiar names to describe genetic lineages. The biblical analogies of Adam and Eve are used to describe the most recent common ancestors via mitochondrial DNA and the y-chromosome. Other male lineages are described as Cain, Abel and Seth. Mitochondrial DNA haplogroups are frequently described using female names from regions where the haplogroups are common. For example, the haplogroup M is named "Manju" as it is frequent in India, and the haplogroup N is named "Nasreen" as it is predominant in Arabia.

== Television documentary ==
The documentary The Real Eve, based on the book and known as Where We Came From in the United Kingdom, was released in 2002. The documentary was produced by the American cable TV network the Discovery Channel and was narrated by Danny Glover and directed by Andrew Piddington.
