= Continuity model of British ancestry =

Proposed British population history

The continuity model of British ancestry is the thesis that Britain's population has remained substantially unchanged since the first post ice age settlement. Although starting in the 1970s, in the mid-2000s it became a temporarily popular explanation for the state of understanding of British genetics.

== Debate ==
The previously dominant model of the makeup of the British population was of a wave of different invasions coming into Britain such as the Anglo-Saxons, Celts and Bell-Beaker people. These invasions would not just take in the culture but they would also impose foreign ruling classes and substantially replace the population.

== Archaeological evidence ==
In the 1970s, a continuity model was popularized by Colin Burgess in his book The Age of Stonehenge, which theorised that the Celtic culture in Great Britain "emerged" rather than resulted from invasion, and that the Celts were not invading aliens, but the descendants of, or culturally influenced by, figures such as the Amesbury Archer, whose burial included clear continental connections.

The archaeological evidence is of substantial cultural continuity through the 1st millennium BCE, although with a significant overlay of selectively adopted elements of the "Celtic" La Tène culture from the 4th century BCE onwards. There are claims of continental-style states appearing in southern England close to the end of the period, possibly reflecting in part immigration by élites from various Gallic states, such as those of the Belgae. Contradictory evidence of chariot burials in England begins about 300 BC and is mostly confined to the Arras culture associated with the Parisii.

== Genetic Influences ==
Stephen Oppenheimer's book The Origins of the British argued that the British gene pool was substantially unaltered from the Britain's original settlement in the late Stone Age with little substantial genetic contribution from subsequent invasions. He claimed the early Y chromosome studies that showed Anglo-Saxon male ancestry were biased, pre-selecting genetic testing methodologies to fit models based on the invasion accounts of Gildas and Procopius, saying that correlations of gene frequency mean nothing without a knowledge of the genetic prehistory of the regions in question. He argued that that the Belgae and related groups with continental genetic markers indistinguishable from Anglo-Saxons arrived earlier and were already strong in the 5th century in particular regions or areas with most of the rest of the population genetically similar to the Basque people of northern Spain and southwestern France, from 90% in Wales to 66% in East Anglia. Oppenheimer suggests that the division between the West and the East of England is not due to the Anglo-Saxon invasion but originates with two main routes of genetic flow – one up the Atlantic coast, the other from neighbouring areas of Continental Europe – which occurred just after the Last Glacial Maximum.

Barry Cunliffe, the Emeritus Professor of European Archaeology at the University of Oxford, has been influential in challenging earlier “waves of invasion” narratives. In works such as Facing the Ocean and Iron Age Communities in Britain, Cunliffe argues that cultural and technological developments in Britain can be explained to a large extent by long-standing maritime connections and gradual exchanges across the English Channel and Atlantic seaboard, rather than by large-scale population displacements, over what he calls the longue durée.

== Popularisation in the 2000s ==
During the early 2000s, versions of the continuity model gained significant public attention. Archaeologist Francis Pryor’s Channel 4 TV series and popular books Britain BC (2003) and Britain AD (2004) advanced arguments that major cultural shifts could be explained by internal development and cross-channel contacts rather than wholesale population replacement.

Bryan Sykes, a former geneticist at Oxford University, also with the BBC's Blood of the Vikings documentary series in 2001 (which as with Oppenheimer argued that the historic record underestimated the Viking genetic influence but greatly overestimated all the other invasions) introduced the thesis to mainstream audiences, with the subsequent follow up bestseller book Blood of the Isles coming to a very similar conclusion to Oppenheimer. The overall effect was that continuity-based perspectives, which had been circulating among archaeologists since at least the 1970s, became more widely recognized among both general readers and some academics by the mid to late 2000s.

== Challenges ==
More recent work has challenged the theories of Oppenheimer and Sykes. David Reich's Harvard laboratory found that the Bell Beaker People from the Lower Rhine had little genetic relation to the Iberians or other southern Europeans. The Beaker Complex to Britain was associated with a replacement of ~90% of Britain's gene pool within a few hundred years, continuing the east-to-west expansion that had brought Steppe-related ancestry into central and northern Europe 400 years earlier.

Modern autosomal genetic clustering is testament to this fact, as the British and Irish cluster genetically very closely with other North European populations, rather than Iberians, Galicians, Basques or those from the south of France. Further, more recent whole genome research has broadly supported the idea that genetic differences between the English and the Welsh have origins in the settlement of the Anglo-Saxons rather than prehistoric migration events.
