= James Walsh (registrar) =

English academic (born 1930)

- Born: 1930; Lancashire
- Died: 30 January 2008
- Occupation: Registrar
- Partner(s): Mary McGrail (m. 1953; div. 1962) Vanessa Rosenthal (m. 1967)

James Jackson Walsh was assistant registrar at the University of Manchester from 1969, deputy registrar at the University of Leeds from 1971, and registrar from 1979 until 1992. The role saw him running one of Leeds University's two main administrative branches.

== Education ==
Following schooling at Nelson Grammar School, Walsh took a first-class honours BA in English (1948–51), an MA (1951–52), and a Graduate Certificate in Education (1952–53) at the University of Leeds.

In 1993, following his retirement from the University of Leeds, the University awarded him the honorary degree of Doctor of Letters.

== Career ==
After university, Walsh undertook two years' national service in the Royal Air Force (1953–55). His Communist Party membership led him not to be commissioned, and he spent the period guarding a bomb-disposal dump at Acaster Malbis. In 1955 he followed his wife Mary to Manchester, where she took up a job in a girls' grammar school, and took an administrative job at the University of Manchester. While at Manchester, Walsh became the founding secretary of the Meeting of University Academic Administrative Staff in 1961. He became Manchester's assistant registrar in 1969, deputy registrar at the University of Leeds from 1971, and the University's fifth registrar from 1979 until retirement in September 1992. Following retirement, he was made registrar emeritus.

== Politics ==
During Walsh's student years, he was an active member of the Communist Party, recruited to a large degree through the efforts of Arnold Kettle, who was variously his teacher, landlord, and friend. Walsh later concluded that his main motivation was that "I desperately, and increasingly desperately, wanted to be a real middle-class intellectual". Growing suspicious of the Party as he began to realise the extent of Russian interference in its activities, he left the party in 1956 over the Soviet invasion of Hungary. His friendship with Kettle appears not to have survived, and he continued to express regrets about Communist Party membership into the twenty-first century.

In the 1997 United Kingdom general election, Walsh stood for election in Barnsley Central as the candidate for the Eurosceptic Referendum Party. He came fourth out of the four candidates, with 1325 votes.

== Research ==
Walsh did not view his MA research, on "Politics and Prose Style in the Writings of Edmund Burke", as a success, opining that he had peaked with his first-class BA "as far as intellectual matters went" and that "I had no idea what research was about". His external examiner, Sherard Vines, came close to failing the thesis.

In retirement, Walsh researched the history of British universities. He amassed extensive interviews with key figures in the 1955–68 expansion of British Universities, now held in Leeds University's Brotherton Library. His research on "The University Movement in the North of England at the End of the Nineteenth Century" was published posthumously.

== Personal life ==
Walsh married his fellow English student Mary McGrail in 1953; they divorced in 1962, with a Decree Absolute being granted in 1964, shortly before Walsh met the woman who was to become his second wife, Vanessa Rosenthal. In 1967 Walsh married Rosenthal, with whom he had the daughters Emilia and Nerissa.

== Autobiography ==
- Walsh, James; Rosenthal, Vanessa (2010). Under the Apple Boughs. Hebden Bridge: Royd House. ISBN 978-1-907197-02-4.
