= Adam's Curse =

Book by Bryan Sykes

- Author: Brian Sykes
- Language: English
- Publisher: Bantam Press
- Publication date: 2003
- Publication place: United kingdom
- Pages: 320
- ISBN: 978-0-393-05896-3

Adam's Curse: A Future Without Men (also known as Adam's Curse: A Story of Sex, Genetics, and the Extinction of Men) is a 2003 book by Oxford University human genetics professor Bryan Sykes expounding his hypothesis that with the declining sperm count in men and the continual atrophy of the Y chromosome, within approximately 125,000 years men shall become extinct.

Sykes thinks one of the options for humanity's survival is unisex reproduction by females: female eggs fertilised by the nuclear X chromosomes of another female and implanted using in vitro fertilisation methods. He also introduces the possibility of moving the SRY and associated genes responsible for maleness and male fertility to another chromosome, which he refers to as "the Adonis chromosome", engendering fertile males with an XX karyotype.

== Reception ==
BBC News reported in 2012 that a US study in Nature suggests the genetic decay has all but ended and that "The conclusion from these comparative studies is that genetic decay has in recent history been minimal, with the human chromosome having lost no further genes in the last six million years, and only one in the last 25 million years."

In a review for the Journal of Clinical Investigation, Kevin Jon Williams wrote that the book "desperately needs an editor’s scalpel — plus a dose of common sense."

== Publication history ==
- Sykes, Bryan (2003), Adam's Curse: A Future Without Men, Bantam, ISBN 0-593-05004-5
- Sykes, Bryan (2004), Adam's Curse: A Future Without Men, New York: W.W. Norton & Company, ISBN 0-393-05896-4

== See also ==
- Sex-determination system
- Y-chromosomal Adam
