= Arnold Kettle =

Arnold Charles Kettle (17 March 1916 – 24 December 1986) was a British Marxist literary critic, most noted for his two-volume work An Introduction to the English Novel (1951), and academic pro-vice-chancellor of the Open University.

== Early life ==
Kettle was born in Ealing, London, and was educated at Merchant Taylors' School, Northwood and Pembroke College, Cambridge, where he was a Cambridge Apostle.

== Career ==
Following demobilisation after the Second World War, Kettle gained work at Cambridge University in 1946, supervising undergraduates. In 1947 he was appointed senior lecturer in the English Literature department of the University of Leeds. His one-time student (and later lodger, friend and fellow Communist Party member) Jim Walsh recalled his second-year tutorials in 1949–50 as "very, very good. He was captivating, and I had never before come across this kind of intellectual experience, which was also emotionally uplifting". 1967 saw Kettle seconded from Leeds as professor of literature to the University of Dar es Salaam as part of the post-independence breakup of University of East Africa, helping to set up a literature department there. In 1970, back in the UK, he became the Open University's first professor of literature, and in 1973 the University's academic pro-vice-chancellor; he worked there until his retirement in 1981.

== Politics ==
Influenced by F. R. Leavis in his academic writings, he was a man of the left politically and joined the Communist Party of Great Britain in 1936, remaining a member for the rest of his life. Jim Walsh recalled visits to the Kettle household in 1951–52 by J. D. Bernal, Hyman Levy, Jack Lindsay, Brian Simon, Doris Lessing, George Matthews and John Gollan.

== Personal life ==
Kettle's wife was Marguerite (Margot) Rosabelle Carritt, née Gale (1915/16–1995); their children were the journalist Martin Kettle (born September 1949) and Nicholas (born January 1953). Kettle was bisexual, appreciating the lack of prejudice from Communist Party members, but according to John R. Turner "throughout his life he never fully came to terms with his situation".

== Selected publications ==
- Kettle, A. (1951). An Introduction to the English Novel, Volume I (to George Eliot) and (1953) An Introduction to the English Novel, Volume II (Henry James to the present day), Hutchinson University Library.
- Kettle, A., Kott, J., & Taborski, B. (1965). Shakespeare in a changing world.
- Kettle, A. (Ed.) (1972). The nineteenth-century novel: critical essays and documents. Heinemann Educational Publishers.
- Kettle, A. (1991). Literature and Liberation: Selected Essays. Manchester University Press.
