= Vanessa Rosenthal =

English actor (born 1943)

- Born: 3 December 1943; Didsbury, Manchester, England
- Died: 17 July 2022 (aged 78)
- Occupations: Actress, playwright
- Partner: James Walsh (1930–2008)

Vanessa Rosenthal (1943–2022) was an English actress and playwright.

== Life ==
Rosenthal was born in Manchester in 1943 to Leonard Rosenthal, a doctor (whose father, Eleazer Rosenthal, had migrated to Britain from Bialystok in 1887), and Hilda, a senior lecturer at what became Manchester Metropolitan University. She was raised in Manchester, attending Jackson's Row Reform Synagogue and Manchester High School, and forming a desire to become an actress by the time she was eleven. She studied at the Central School of Drama 1962–65, spending time on a kibbutz in 1964.

In 1966 Rosenthal married Jim Walsh, with whom she had the daughters Emilia and Nerissa, and in 1971 moved to Leeds, upon Walsh's appointment as deputy registrar of the University of Leeds.

Roles included Miss Prism in The Importance Of Being Earnest (National Theatre, 1999) and the lead role in the West Yorkshire Playhouse production of The Lady In The Van by Alan Bennett (2002). Film credits included Wetherby (1985), while television credits included Emmerdale, Heartbeat and The Royal.

Rosenthal began writing drama in 1998, going on to write twenty-eight plays for BBC radio, including Exchanges in Bialystok and Bye Bye Miss American High, which in 2001 was nominated for a Bafta award.

== Autobiographies ==
- Walsh, James; Rosenthal, Vanessa (2010). Under the Apple Boughs. Hebden Bridge: Royd House. ISBN 978-1-907197-02-4.
- Rosenthal, Vanessa (2021). Inside Out: A Life in Stages. [Reading]: RedDoor Press. ISBN 9781913062835.
