= Clare Griffiths (statistician) =

British statistician

- Education: University College London; London School of Hygiene & Tropical Medicine
- Scientific career
- Workplaces: UK Health Security Agency; Public Health England; Office for National Statistics

Clare Griffiths is a British statistician who is head of the UK COVID-19 dashboard at the UK Health Security Agency, previously known as Public Health England. She specialises in mortality statistics. During the COVID-19 pandemic, Griffiths provided the daily COVID statistics for the United Kingdom.

== Early life and education ==
Griffiths studied at Manchester High School for Girls and continued her studies with a degree of human sciences at University College London. She moved to the London School of Hygiene & Tropical Medicine as a graduate student, where she completed a master's degree in medical demography.

== Career ==
In 1998, Griffiths joined the Office for National Statistics as a researcher. She served as Head of Mortality Analysis at the Office for National Statistics from 2004.

Griffiths joined Public Health England at its formation in 2013, leading work on the Public Health Outcomes Framework. She was made Head of the Profession for Statistics in 2019. In the early days of the COVID-19 pandemic, Griffiths was invited to join the COVID-19 dashboard team. She said that even before being asked she had already started wondering how big data could be used to inform public policy. She became responsible for the Government of the United Kingdom's COVID dashboard, which reported data on the daily number of cases, deaths and vaccinations. The data is released daily at 16:00.

In 2021, the I newspaper described Griffiths' dashboard as being more clear and detailed than any other COVID dashboard.

== Selected publications ==
- Jean-Marie Robine; Siu Lan K. Cheung; Sophie Le Roy; Herman Van Oyen; Clare Griffiths; Jean-Pierre Michel; François Richard Herrmann (February 2008). "Death toll exceeded 70,000 in Europe during the summer of 2003". Comptes Rendus. Biologies. 331 (2): 171–178. doi:10.1016/j.crvi.2007.12.001. ISSN 1631-0691. PMID 18241810. Wikidata Q24289447.
- Wild SH; Colin Fischbacher; Brock A; Griffiths C; Bhopal R (24 April 2007). "Mortality from all causes and circulatory disease by country of birth in England and Wales 2001-2003". Journal of Public Health. 29 (2): 191–198. doi:10.1093/pubmed/fdm010. ISSN 1741-3842. PMID 17456532. Wikidata Q57937176.
- Howard Meltzer; Clare Griffiths; Anita Brock; Cleo Rooney; Rachel Jenkins (1 July 2008). "Patterns of suicide by occupation in England and Wales: 2001-2005". British Journal of Psychiatry. 193 (1): 73–76. doi:10.1192/bjp.bp.107.040550. ISSN 0007-1250. PMID 18700224. Wikidata Q38454905.
