= People of the British Isles =

UK-based population genetics project

- Established: 2004
- Research type: Science research project
- Director: Walter Bodmer
- Faculty: Department of Oncology
- Location: Old Road Campus Research Building, Oxford, OX3 7DQ
- Campus: University of Oxford
- Affiliations: Wellcome Trust
- Website: PoBI

The People of the British Isles (PoBI) is an ongoing population genetics project based at the University of Oxford. The project began in 2004 and is ongoing. Professor Sir Walter Bodmer founded and leads the project.

== Genetic history of the British Isles ==
The first anatomically modern people to colonise Britain arrived in around 30,000 BC, as shown by the Red Lady of Paviland. During the last Ice Age, in particular in the Last Glacial Maximum, the British Isles was probably deserted but people began returning about 15,000 BC. Whether or not the British Isles were deserted during the last cold period around 10,000 BC, the Younger Dryas, is unclear but since then the genetic history of the isles has been continuous, with many immigrations from the continent of Europe since then as well as emigrations.

Britain in 600

== Project data ==
So far PoBI has sampled around 4,500 blood samples. Although based at the University of Oxford, samples have been collected by a number of other British universities, and data shared. An approximately equal number of male and female samples were collected, with a median age at collection of 65 years.

The project looks at around 600,000 single-nucleotide polymorphisms (genetic markers), including genes on Y-DNA and mtDNA, in collaboration with Professor Peter Donnelly at the Wellcome Trust Centre for Human Genetics. Volunteers are sampled from throughout the United Kingdom, with the requirement that they have four grandparents who were born in the same rural area. Blood samples (20ml each) are collected from each volunteer and the peripheral blood lymphocytes separated off and frozen down. DNA is prepared from the blood residue and is the DNA source for the analysis. Once this source of DNA has run out for an individual sample, a cell line can be created from the lymphocytes, which ensures a permanent source of DNA for further work. A number of normal phenotypes have been collected for each volunteer, including 3D face photographs (around 2000 individuals). Analysis of this data set was undertaken in collaboration with Professor Josef Kittler of the University of Surrey and published in 2018.

== Findings ==
Most of southern, eastern and central England has shown a somewhat close genetic similarity with modern populations in the Low Countries, Germany and Denmark, which has been interpreted as representing a major contribution by peoples originally from north Germany or Denmark such as the Angles, Saxons, Jutes, Frisians, Franks, later Danes and the previous Belgae Celts who had inhabited the same areas of Britain, or prior immigrants from before the aforementioned peoples arrived while the populations of areas such as Wales and southwestern England are closer to populations of modern-day western France. A member of the research team, Bruce Winney, said:

We might be seeing the result of Anglo-Saxon invasions pushing other peoples down into Cornwall or Wales, or we might be seeing how Britain was recolonised after the ice ages. The West of our islands may have been peopled by movement up the coastal areas from Atlantic-facing Europe, whilst the southeast was influenced by pre-Anglo-Saxon movements from the area that now spans Denmark to Belgium. These patterns may then have been reinforced by the Anglo-Saxon invasions much later.

A 2015 report on the project's findings concluded that 10-40% of the DNA of most English people was contributed by the Anglo-Saxon settlers in the fifth and sixth centuries.

Analysis of 3D facial image data has found evidence for genetic variants with large statistical effects on facial features.

Samples from the project have been used in several other studies on the traces of historically-attested migrations on British population groups.
