= Robert E. M. Hedges =

British archaeologist and academic (born 1944)

Robert Ernest Mortimer Hedges is a British archaeologist and academic.

Born in 1944, Hedges attended High Wycombe Royal Grammar School (1955–61) and studied for his Doctor of Philosophy degree at Cambridge University. He was appointed a Fellow of St Cross College, Oxford University, and worked at Oxford University since at least 1994, when he was reappointed a lecturer in Archaeology "from 1 November 1994 until the retiring age".

Hedges' research involves archaeological studies of ancient human and animal diets and the environments uncovered at archaeological sites. He was awarded one of the Royal Society's Royal Medals for 2008, for his contribution to the rapid development of accelerator mass spectrometry and radiocarbon dating techniques.

In 2009, a festschrift was held in Hedges' honour to mark his retirement as deputy director of the Research Laboratory for Archaeology and the History of Art. As of 2012, he is Professor of Archaeological Science at the School of Archaeology and emeritus Fellow of St Cross.
