= Genetic descent from Genghis Khan =

With the advent of genealogical DNA testing, a larger and broader circle of people have begun to claim genetic descent from Genghis Khan owing to dubious and imprecise haplogroup identifications. However, while many of Genghis Khan's agnates' resting places are known (e.g. Shah Jahan in the Taj Mahal), none of their remains have been tested to prove or disprove these theories and debate continues (see below).

== DNA evidence ==
Scientists have speculated about the Y-chromosomal haplogroup (and therefore patrilineal ancestry) of Genghis Khan.

Zerjal et al. (2003) identified a Y-chromosomal lineage haplogroup C*(xC3c) present in about 8% of men in a region of Asia "stretching from northeast China to Uzbekistan", which would be around 16 million men at the time of publication, "if [Zerjal et al's] sample is representative." The authors propose that the lineage was likely carried by male-line descendants of Genghis Khan, because of its presence in certain ethnic groups rumored to be their descendants. One study published in the Russian Journal of Genetics found that 24% of Mongolians carry this haplogroup, and that it occurs in low frequencies in neighboring Turkic states (with the exception of Kazakhstan).

A white paper by the American Society of Human Genetics Ancestry and Ancestry Testing Task Force, Royal et al. (2010) observed the Zerjal et al. hypothesis:

Although such a connection is by no means impossible, we currently have no way of assessing how much confidence to place in such a connection. We emphasize, however, that whenever formal inferences about population history have been attempted with uniparental systems, the statistical power is generally low. Claims of connections, therefore, between specific uniparental lineages and historical figures or historical migrations of peoples are merely speculative.

In a 2017 review paper published in Human Genetics, authors Chiara Batini and Mark Jobling cast doubts on Zerjal's 2003 theory that Genghis Khan is linked to haplogroup C:

Ancient DNA data (Lkhagvasuren et al. 2016) from remains in high-status Mongolian graves dated to 1130–1250 CE revealed MSY lineages belonging to hg R1b, rather than hg C: there are a number of explanations for such findings, but taken at face value, they do not support the Genghis Khan hypothesis for the origin of the widespread Asian expansion lineage (Zerjal et al. 2003).

=== Proposed candidate haplogroups and haplotypes ===
Over the years, following haplogroups have been proposed as candidates:

- Haplogroup C-M217
  - C2c1a1a1-M407: Carried by Mongol descendants of the Northern Yuan ruler from 1474 to 1517, Dayan Khan who was a male line descendant of Genghis Khan, According to a study analysing Y-chromosome Haplogroups of Mongolic speaking populations, geneticists Sabitov and Batbayar used highly detailed, verified historical pedigrees (such as the Altan Tobchi and Erdeniin Tobchi) to identify modern Mongolian men who possessed undisputed paperwork proving their direct, unbroken patrilineal descent from Dayan Khan. The researchers tested 7 different male line families who were descendants of completely different branches of Dayan Khan's sons. And when the Y-chromosomes were sequenced, all seven matched, sharing the exact same downstream mutations, and determined Dayan Khan had the C2c1a1a1-M407 Y-Haplogroup, and is the most plausible candidate for the Y-chromosome lineage of Genghis Khan.
  - C2b1a3a1c2-F5481 (C-M217*-Star Cluster / clade of C2*-ST): Widespread in Central Asia among Kazakhs, Hazaras and ordinary commoner Mongols. The Kerey clan of the Kazakhs have a high amount of the C3* star-cluster (C2*-ST) Y chromosome and it is very high among Hazaras, Kazakhs and Mongols in general.
    However, in 2017 a Chinese research team suggested that the Y chromosome C-M217*-Star Cluster likely traces back to ordinary Mongol warriors, rather than Genghis Khan, and that "a direct linking of haplogroup C-M217 to Genghis Khan has yet to be discovered."
    In a review paper published in Human Genetics, authors Chiara Batini and Mark Jobling cast doubts on Zerjal's 2003 theory that Genghis Khan is linked to haplogroup C
  - C2b1a1b1-F1756: In 2019, a Chinese research team study suggested that Haplogroup C2b1a1b1-F1756 might be a candidate of the true Y lineage of Genghis Khan.
    The Lu clan claimed to be the descendants of Khulgen, the sixth son of Genghis Khan. A genetic study of the molecular genealogy of Northwest China shows that some members of Lu belong to Y-DNA haplogroup C2b1a1b1 F1756. This haplogroup is also observed in the Tore clan from Kazakhstan, who are paternal descendants of Jochi, the first alleged son of Genghis Khan. However, the claim that the Lu clan is descendant of Khulgen is controversial and is disputed by several other studies.
- Haplogroup R1b
  - Research published in 2016 suggested that Genghis possibly belonged to the haplogroup Haplogroup R1b (R1b-M343). Five bodies, dating from about 1130–1250, were found in graves in Tavan Tolgoi, Mongolia. The authors suggested they were members of the Golden Family, and linked the spread of R1b-M343 to the former territories of the Mongol Empire. The authors also suggested that the Tavan Tolgoi bodies are related either to the female lineages of Genghis Khan's Borjigin clan, or to Genghis Khan's male lineage, rather than the Ongud clan.

== See also ==
- Descent from antiquity
- List of haplogroups of historic people
