= Walter Bodmer =

German-born British human geneticist

Sir Walter Bodmer FRS FRSE
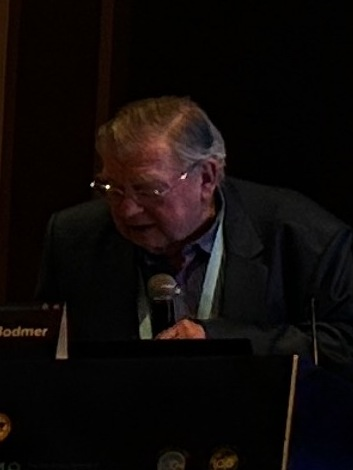
- Walter Bodmer, 2023
- Born: Walter Fred Bodmer; 10 January 1936 (age 90); Frankfurt, Germany
- Education: Manchester Grammar School; University of Cambridge (BA, PhD)
- Spouse: Julia Bodmer (m. 1956; died 2001)
- Awards: Royal Medal (2013); Dalton Medal (2002); Michael Faraday Prize (1994); Ellison–Cliffe Lecture (1987); Knight Bachelor (1986); Mendel Medal (1981); William Allan Award (1980)
- Scientific career
- Workplaces: Stanford University; University of Oxford
- Thesis: The study of population genetics and gene effects, with special reference to Primula vulgaris and the house mouse (1959)
- Academic advisors: Ronald Fisher
- Doctoral students: Marcus Feldman; Peter Goodfellow; Veronica van Heyningen
- Website: imm.ox.ac.uk/walter-bodmer-2; www.oncology.ox.ac.uk/research/walter-bodmer

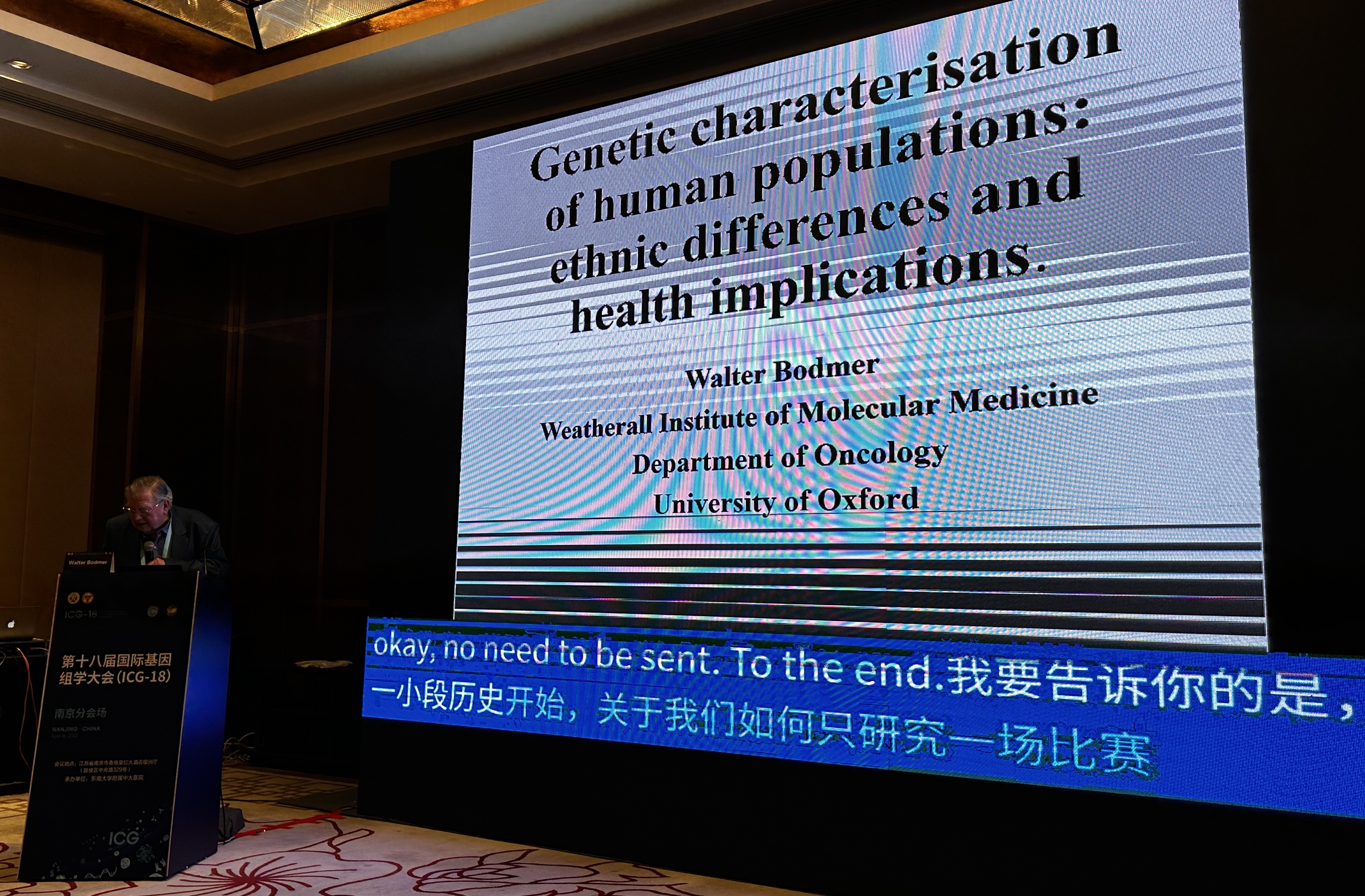
Walter Bodmer presenting at the ICG-18 conference in Nanjing. China

Sir Walter Fred Bodmer FRS FRSE (born 10 January 1936) is a German-born British human geneticist.

== Early life ==
Bodmer was born in Frankfurt, Germany. He was educated at Manchester Grammar School and went on to study the Mathematical Tripos at the University of Cambridge as a student of Clare College, Cambridge. He was awarded his PhD in 1959 from Cambridge for research on population genetics in the house mouse and Primula vulgaris (primrose) supervised by Ronald Fisher.

== Career and research ==
In 1961 Bodmer joined Joshua Lederberg's laboratory in the genetics department of Stanford University as a postdoctoral researcher, continuing his work on population genetics. In 1962 Walter Bodmer was appointed to the faculty at Stanford. He left Stanford University in 1970 to become the first professor of genetics at the University of Oxford.

Bodmer was Vice-President of the Royal Institution from 1981 until 1982.

Bodmer developed models for population genetics and worked on the human leukocyte antigen system and the use of somatic cell hybrids for human linkage studies. In 1985 he chaired a Royal Society committee which wrote The Bodmer Report; this has been credited with starting the movement for the public understanding of science. The report was instrumental in leading to the creation of the Committee on the Public Understanding of Science (COPUS) in 1987.

Bodmer was one of the first to suggest the idea of the Human Genome Project. In 1987 he received the Ellison-Cliffe Medal from the Royal Society of Medicine. He was the director of research (1979–1991) and then director general (1991–1996) of the Imperial Cancer Research Fund. He was also chancellor of the University of Salford, England (1995–2005; succeeded by Sir Martin Harris) and principal of Hertford College, Oxford (1996–2005; succeeded by Dr. John Landers).

In 2005, Bodmer was appointed to lead a £2.3 million project (roughly US$4.5 million) by the Wellcome Trust at the University of Oxford to examine the genetic makeup of the United Kingdom – the People of the British Isles project. He was joined by Oxford Professor Peter Donnelly (a population genetics and statistics expert) and the Wellcome Trust Principal Research Fellow Lon Cardon. Bodmer said, "Our aim is to characterise the genetic make-up of the British population and relate this to the historical and archaeological evidence." The researchers presented some of their findings to the public via the Channel 4 television series "Faces of Britain". On 14 April 2007, Channel 4 in Britain aired a program that highlighted the study's then-current findings. The project took DNA samples from hundreds of volunteers throughout Britain, seeking tell-tale fragments of DNA that would reveal the biological traces of successive waves of colonisers – Celts, Saxons, Vikings, etc. – in various parts of Britain. The findings showed that the Viking invasion of Britain was predominantly from Danish Vikings while the Orkney Islands were settled by Norwegian Vikings. This research was most recently presented at the Galton Institute's conference on 'New Light on Old Britons' in 2019. Bodmer had previously worked with the Galton Institute as its president from 2008 to 2014.

He has been head of the cancer and immunogenetics laboratory in the Weatherall Institute of Molecular Medicine at the University of Oxford since 1996. Research interests of the laboratory include the fundamental genetics and biology of colorectal cancer.

=== Honours and awards ===
Bodmer has won numerous awards including:

- 1972: Elected member of the American Academy of Arts and Sciences.
- 1974: Fellow of the Royal Society
- 1980: William Allan Award
- 1981: Elected member of the United States National Academy of Sciences.
- 1986: Knight Bachelor
- 1987: Ellison-Cliffe Medal from the Royal Society of Medicine.
- 1988: Honorary Degree (Doctor of Science) from the University of Bath.
- 1989: Elected member of the American Philosophical Society
- 1992: Honorary Fellow of the Royal Society of Edinburgh (FRSE)
- 1994: Michael Faraday Prize
- 2002 Dalton Medal from the Manchester Literary and Philosophical Society.
- 2013: Royal Medal from the Royal Society
- 1984: delivered the Royal Institution Christmas Lectures on The Message of the Genes.
- Honorary member, British Society for Immunology

His certificate of election to the Royal Society reads:

Distinguished for his theoretical and experimental contributions to genetics. His analyses of population genetics models, especially human, his contribution to the understanding of bacterial transformation, to the understanding of the HL-A system, and to the use of somatic cell hybrids for human linkage studies are outstanding. Few scientists have contributed distinguished work in such a range of fields, and involving such a range of experience of techniques, mathematical and experimental, and such a range of organisms.

== Personal life ==
Bodmer's father was Jewish so the family were obliged to leave Nazi Germany; in 1938, they settled in Manchester, England. In 1956, Walter Bodmer married Julia Bodmer (née Pilkington; 1934–2001); she also became a well-known geneticist. They had two sons and a daughter.

== Interviews ==
- Bodmer, Walter (2017). "Sir Walter Bodmer FRS in interview with Dr Max Blythe: Interview 1" (Interview). Interviewed by Blythe, Max. Oxford Brookes University. doi:10.24384/000458.
- Bodmer, Walter (1998). "Sir Walter Bodmer FRS in interview with Dr Max Blythe: Interview 2" (Interview). Interviewed by Blythe, Max. Oxford Brookes University. doi:10.24384/000007.

Academic offices
Preceded by The Duchess of York	Chancellor of the University of Salford; 1995–2006	Succeeded by Sir Martin Harris
Preceded by Christopher Zeeman	Principal of Hertford College, Oxford; 1996–2005	Succeeded by John Landers
