= Genetics and archaeogenetics of South Asia =

Biological field of study

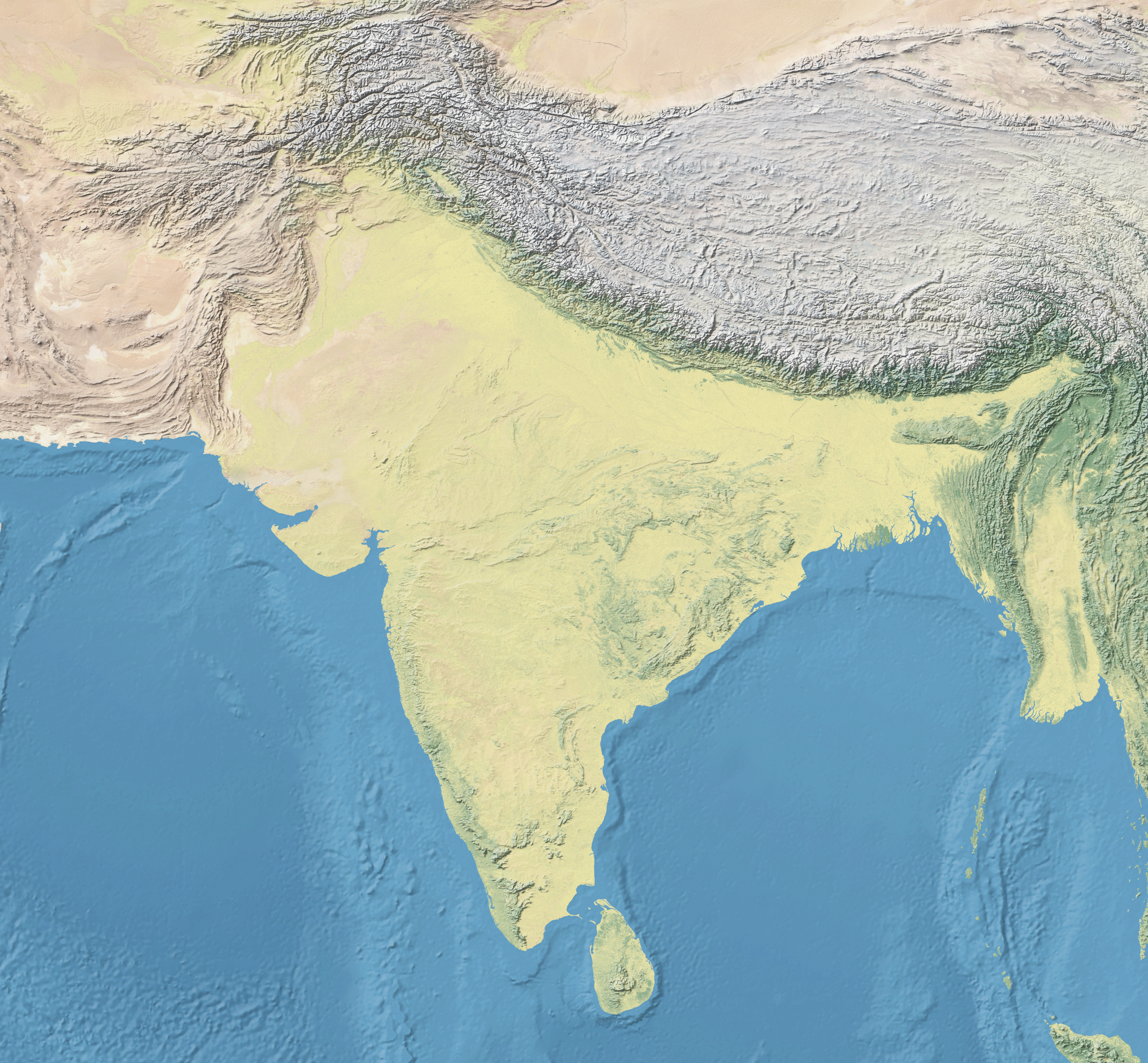
The people of South Asia are broadly of a mixture of the Western Steppe Herder (WSH), the Iran Neolithic derived IVC-related ancestry and excess Ancient Ancestral South Indian (AASI) hunter-gatherer ancestry.

Genetics and archaeogenetics of South Asia is the study of the genetics and archaeogenetics of the ethnic groups of South Asia. It aims at uncovering these groups' genetic histories. The geographic position of the Indian subcontinent makes its biodiversity important for the study of the early dispersal of anatomically modern humans across Asia.

Based on mitochondrial DNA (mtDNA) variations, genetic unity across various South Asian subpopulations have shown that most of the ancestral nodes of the phylogenetic tree of all the mtDNA types originated in the subcontinent. Conclusions of studies based on Y chromosome variation and autosomal DNA variation have been varied.

The genetic makeup of modern South Asians can be described at the deepest level as a combination of West Eurasian (related to ancient and modern people in Europe and West Asia) ancestries with divergent East Eurasian ancestries. The latter primarily include a proposed indigenous South Asian component (termed Ancient Ancestral South Indians, short "AASI") that is distantly related to the Andamanese peoples, as well as to East/Southeast Asians and Australasians, and further include additional, regionally variable East/Southeast Asians components.

The proposed AASI type ancestry is closest to the non-West Eurasian part, termed S-component, extracted from South Asian samples, especially those from the Irula tribe, and is generally found throughout all South Asian ethnic groups in varying degrees. The West Eurasian ancestry, which is closely related to Mesolithic hunter-gatherers and Neolithic farmers who lived on the Iranian Plateau (who are also closely related to Caucasus hunter-gatherers), forms the major source of the South Asian genetic makeup, and combined with varying degrees of AASI ancestry, formed the Indus Periphery Cline around ~5400–3700 BCE, which constitutes the main ancestral heritage of most modern South Asian groups. The Indus Periphery ancestry, around the 2nd millennium BCE, mixed with another West Eurasian wave, the incoming mostly male-mediated Yamnaya-Steppe component (archaeogenetically dubbed the Western Steppe Herders) to form the Ancestral North Indians (ANI), while at the same time it contributed to the formation of Ancestral South Indians (ASI) by admixture with hunter-gatherers having higher proportions of AASI-related ancestry. The ANI–ASI gradient, as demonstrated by the higher proportion of ANI in traditionally upper caste and Indo-European speakers, that resulted because of the admixture between the ANI and the ASI after 2000 BCE at various proportions is termed as the Indian Cline. The East Asian ancestry component forms the major ancestry among Tibeto-Burmese and Khasian speakers, and is generally restricted to the Himalayan foothills and Northeast India, with substantial presence also in Munda-speaking groups, as well as in some populations of northern, central and eastern South Asia.

== Overview ==
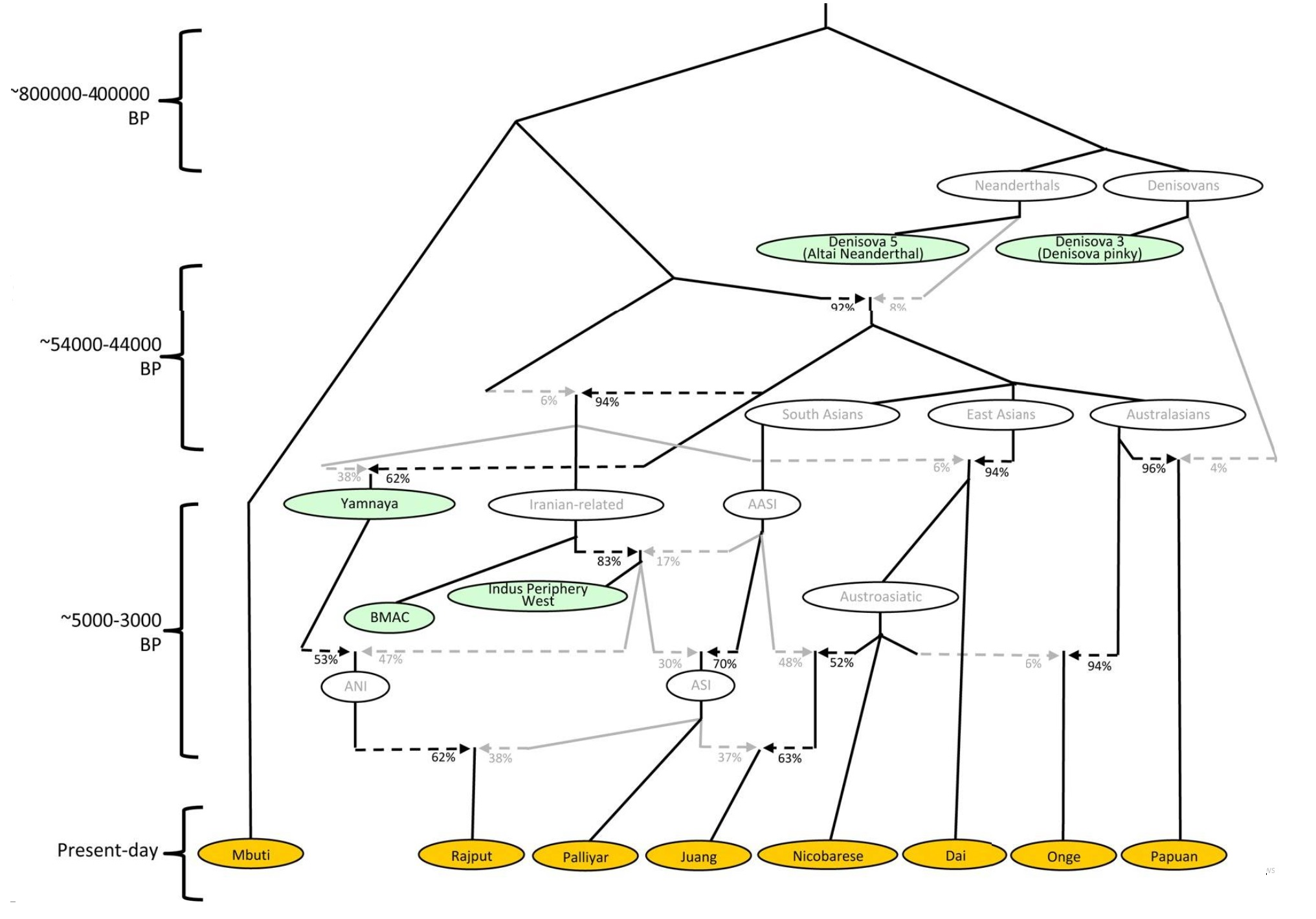
Graph model showing various admixture proportions in ancient and modern populations of South Asia (Narasimhan 2019)

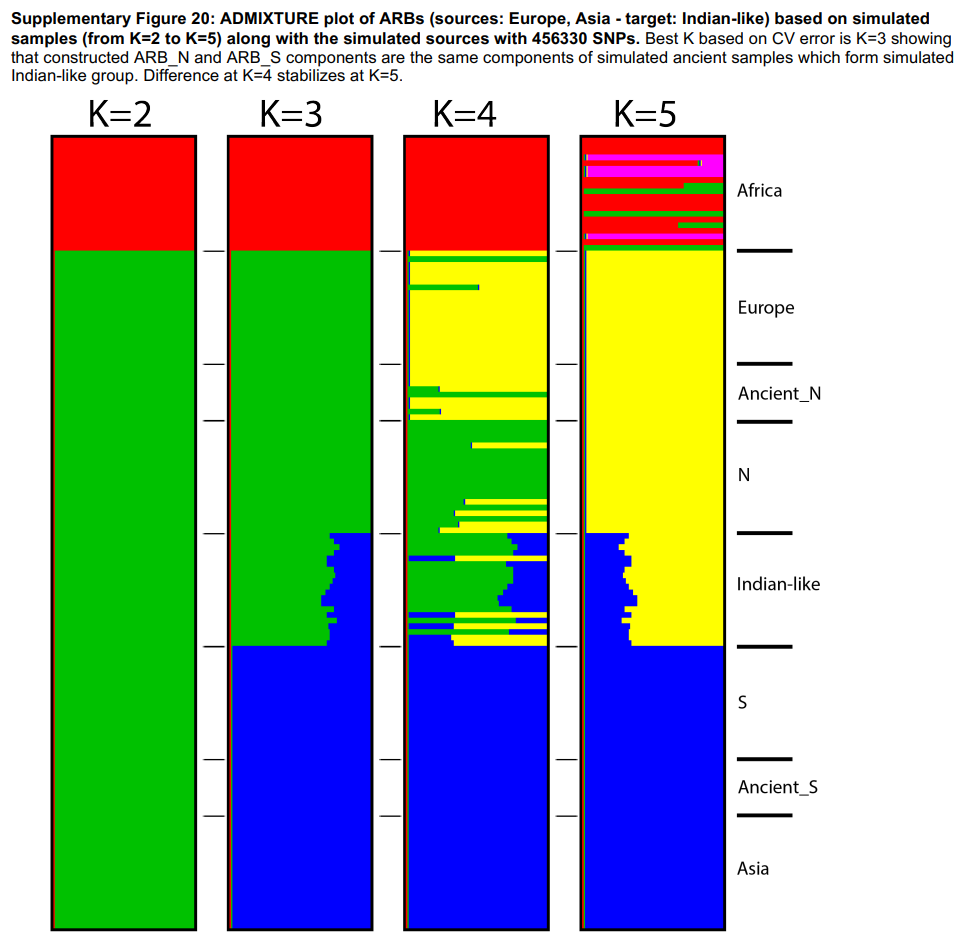
Ancestral components modelled at K2 to K5 for modern South Asian ("Indian-like") populations based on improved "masks" with 456330 SNPs (Yelmen 2019)

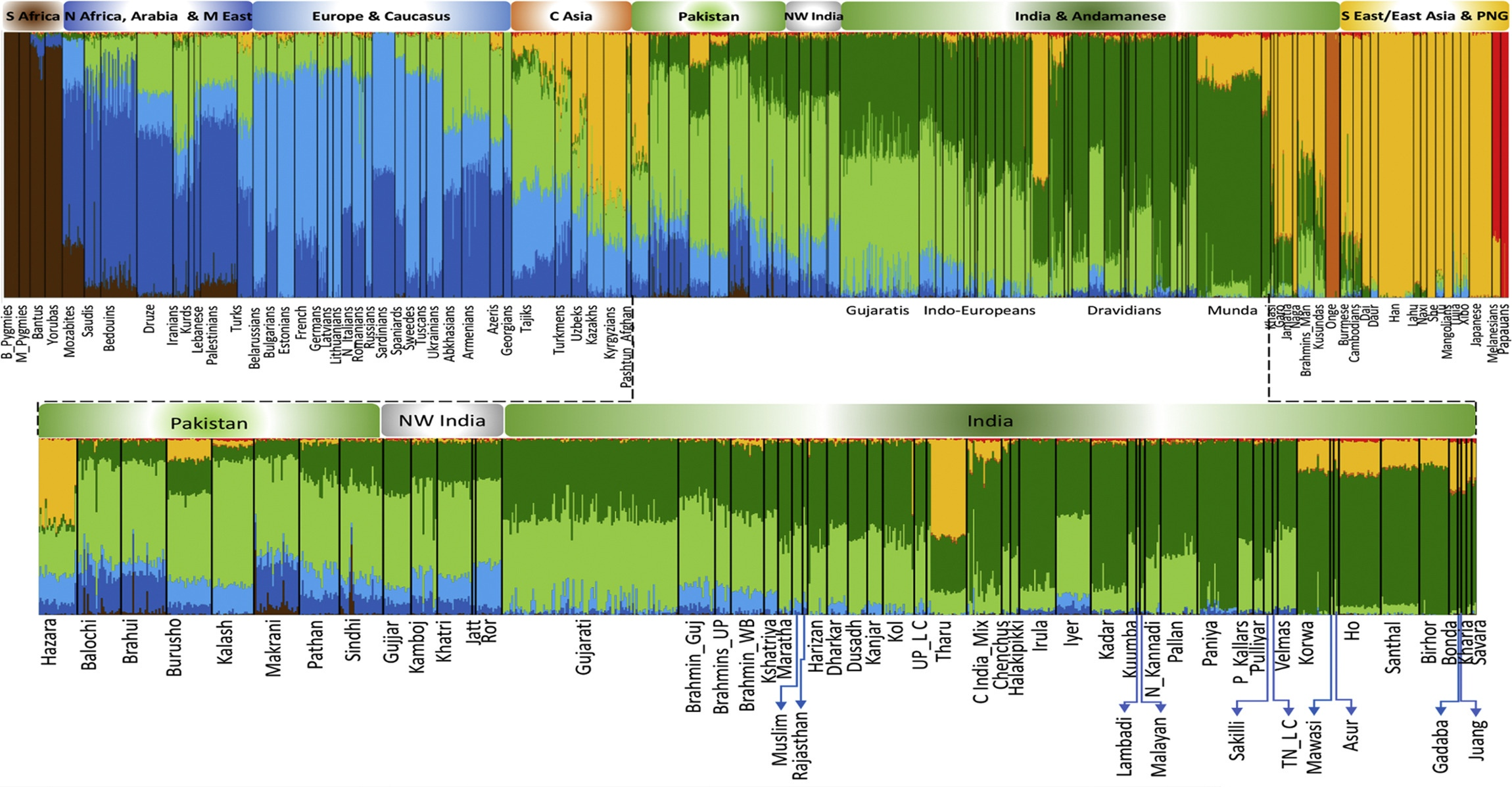
Results of ADMIXTURE analysis at K8 ancestral components with global populations. The populations are ordered geographically in a bar plot (Pathak 2018).

Modern South Asians are descendants of a combination of Western Eurasian ancestries (notably "Iranian Neolithic Farmers" and "Western Steppe Herders" components) with an indigenous East Eurasian component (termed Ancient Ancestral South Indians, short "AASI") closest to the non–West Eurasian part extracted from South Asian samples; distantly related to the Andamanese peoples, East/Southeast Asians and Australasians, as well as regional variable additional East/Southeast Asian components respectively.

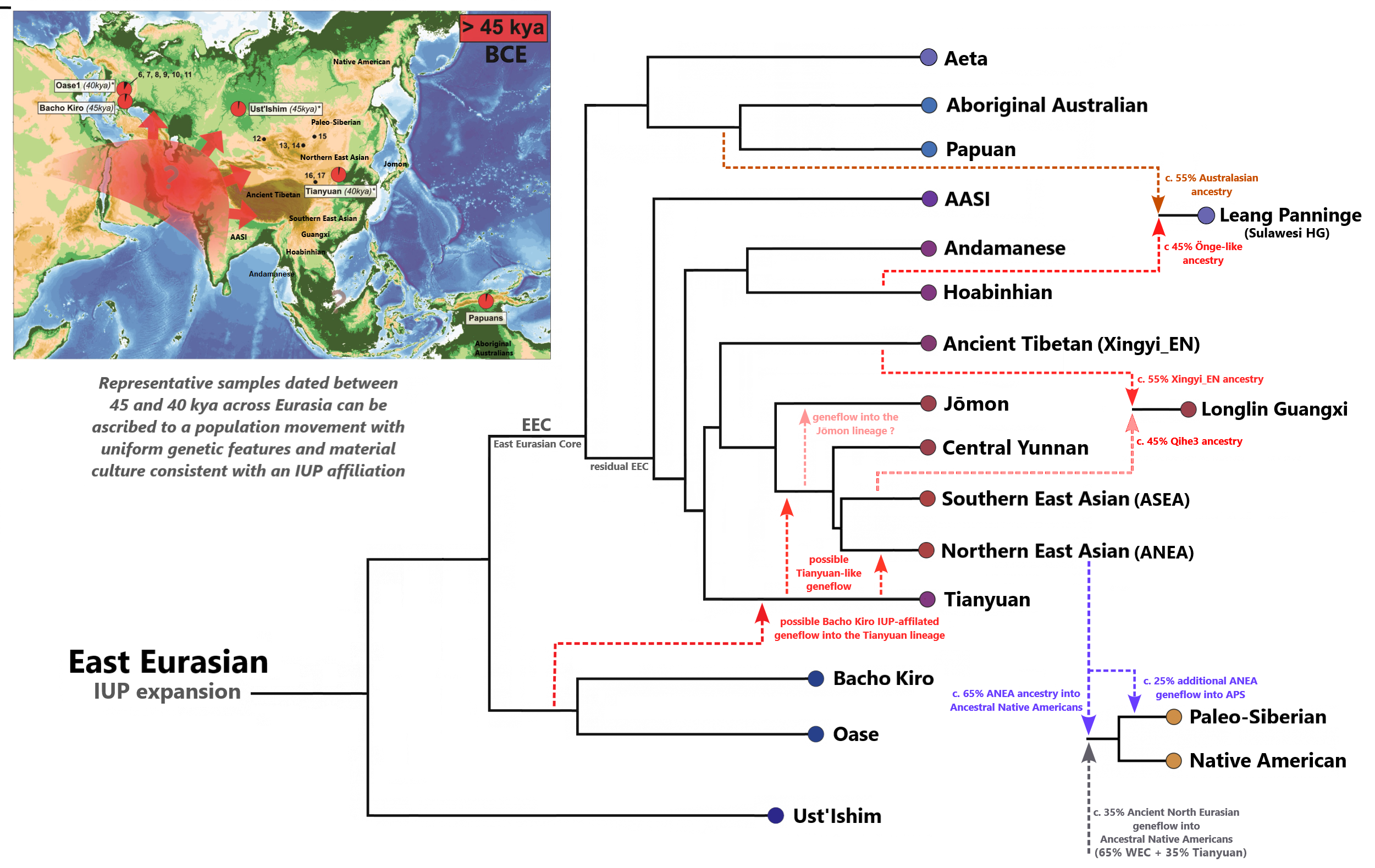
Phylogenetic position of the Indigenous South Asian (AASI) lineage among other East Eurasians

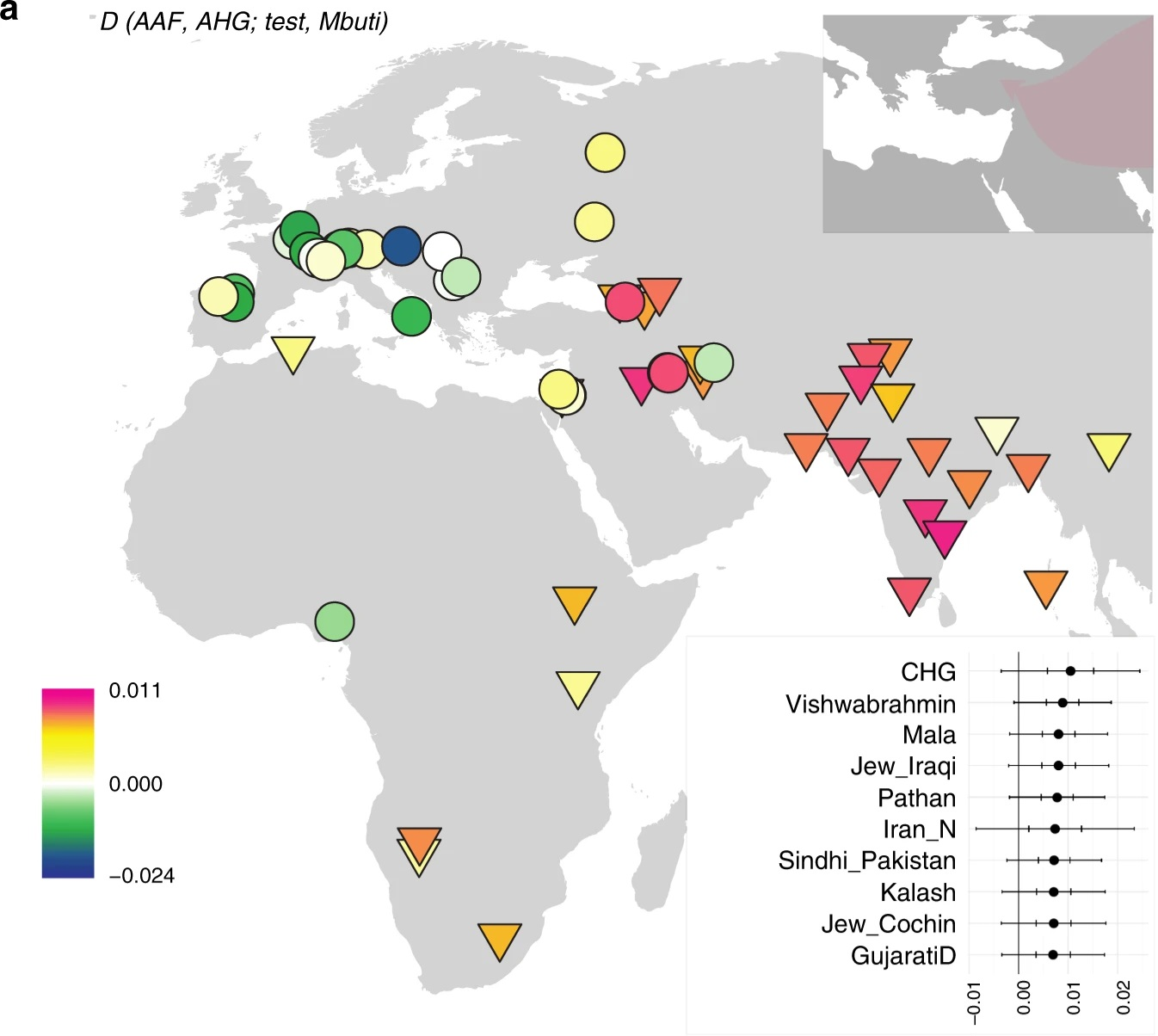
Modern South Asians display high genetic affinities to Ancient Iranian and Caucasus hunter-gatherer lineages.

The proposed AASI lineage, which is hypothesized to represent the ancestry of the very first hunter-gatherers and peoples of the Indian subcontinent, formed around ~40,000 years BCE. It was found that the AASI are distinct from Western Eurasian groups and have a closer genetic affinity with Ancient East Eurasians (such as Andamanese Onge or East Asian peoples) which is suggested to have diverged from Ancient West Eurasians around 48,000 years ago likely on the Persian plateau. Based on this, it has been inferred that the AASI lineage diverged from other Eastern Eurasian lineages, such as 'East and Southeast Asians' and 'Australasians', during their dispersal using a Southern route. The Andamanese people are among the relatively most closely related modern populations to the AASI component and henceforth used as an (imperfect) proxy for it, but others (Yelmen et al. 2019) note that both are deeply diverged from each other, and propose that the AASI type ancestry is closest to the non-West Eurasian part, termed S-component, extracted from the South Asian samples, especially those from the Irula tribe. Shinde et al. 2019 noted that both Andamanese Onge or East Siberian groups can be used as proxy for the non-West Eurasian-related component in the "qpAdm" admixture-modelling of an IVC-related individual (labelled "I6113") because both populations "have the same phylogenetic relationship to the non-West Eurasian-related of I6113 likely due to shared ancestry deeply in time".

Bennett et al. 2024 summarised:

AASI: – Ancient Ancestral South Indian, one of three deeply branching East Asian lineages (with AA and ESEA). This South Asian hunter-gatherer ancestry is found primarily in present-day southern India and South Asia.

Genetic data shows that the main West Eurasian geneflow event happened during the Neolithic period, or already during the Holocene (pre-Neolithic period) by Iranian hunter-gatherers. There is also evidence that some West Eurasian like ancestry reached South Asia earlier, during the Upper Paleolithic (around 40,000–30,000 years BCE)." Yet, the pre-Neolithic ancestry of South Asia belonged to "an indisputably EEC genetic component ... that made up the majority of the pre-Neolithic genetic landscape".

The Neolithic or Pre-Neolithic Iranian geneflow, in tandem with variable amounts of AASI admixture, gave rise to the Indus Periphery Cline, which is characteristic for modern South Asians and forms the major source of the gene pool. The introduction of this ancestry might be associated with the spread of Dravidian languages. Genetic data suggests that the specific Ancient Iranian-related lineage diverged from other lineages from the Neolithic Iranian plateau about 10,000 years ago. According to an international research team led by palaeogeneticists of the Johannes Gutenberg University Mainz (JGU), the main ancestry component of South Asians is derived from a population related to Neolithic farmers from the eastern Fertile Crescent and Iran. The Iranian-related ancestry found in >95% of individuals on the Indian cline can also be modelled as deriving from Early Neolithic Sarazm (Sarazm_EN) populations from Tajikistan. Sarazm_EN can be modeled as a mixture of pre-Copper Age-related populations related to Western Siberian Hunter-Gatherers, Neolithic Anatolians and Neolithic Ganj Dareh-related Iranians.

In the 2nd millennium BCE, the Indus Periphery-related ancestry mixed with the arriving Yamnaya-Steppe component forming the Ancestral North Indians (ANI), while at the same time it contributed to the formation of Ancestral South Indians (ASI) by admixture with hunter-gatherers further South having higher proportions of AASI-related ancestry. The proximity to West Eurasian populations is based on the ANI-ASI gradient, also termed the Indian Cline, with the groups harbouring higher ANI-ancestry being closer to West Eurasians as compared to populations harbouring higher ASI-ancestry. Tribal groups from southern India harbour mostly ASI ancestry and sits farthest from West Eurasian groups on the PCA compared to other South Asians. The Yamnaya or Western Steppe pastoralist component is found in higher frequency among Indo-Aryan speakers, and is distributed throughout the Indian subcontinent at lower frequency. Certain communities and caste groups from the northern Indian subcontinent display a peak of Western Steppe Herder ancestry at similar amounts as Northern Europeans.

An East Asian-related ancestry component forms the major ancestry among Tibeto-Burmese and Khasi an speakers in the Himalayan foothills and Northeast India, and is also found in substantial presence in Mundari-speaking groups. According to Zhang et al., Austroasiatic migrations from Southeast Asia into India took place after the last Glacial maximum, circa 10,000 years ago. Arunkumar et al. suggest Austroasiatic migrations from Southeast Asia occurred into Northeast India 5.2 ± 0.6 kya and into East India 4.3 ± 0.2 kya. Tätte et al. 2019 estimated that the Austroasiatic language speaking people admixed with Indian population about 2000–3800 years ago, which may suggest arrival of Southeast Asian genetic component in the area. A Southeast Asian-like genetic substrate within Northeast India is also detected by Tagore et al. 2022.

It has been found that the ancestral node of the phylogenetic tree of all the mtDNA types (mitochondrial DNA haplogroups) typically found in Central Asia, the West Asia and Europe are also to be found in South Asia at relatively high frequencies. The inferred divergence of this common ancestral node is estimated to have occurred slightly less than 50,000 years ago. In India, the major maternal lineages are various M subclades, followed by R and U sublineages. These mitochondrial haplogroups' coalescence times have been approximated to date to 50,000 BP.

The major paternal lineages of South Asians are represented by the West Eurasian-affiliated haplogroups R1a1, R2, H, L and J2. A minority belongs to the East Eurasian-affiliated Haplogroup O-M175. O-M175 is mainly restricted to Austroasiatic and Tibeto-Burmese speakers, and also common among East and Southeast Asians, while H is largely restricted to South Asians and R1a1, J2 and L as well as a subclade of H (H2) are commonly found among European and Middle Eastern populations. Some researchers have argued that Y-DNA Haplogroup R1a1 (M17) is of autochthonous South Asian origin. However, proposals for a Central Asian/Eurasian steppe origin for R1a1 are also quite common and supported by several more recent studies. Other minor haplogroups include subclades of Q-M242, G-M201, R1b, as well as Haplogroup C-M130.

Genetic studies comparing eight X chromosome based STR markers using a multidimensional scaling plot (MDS plot), revealed that modern-day South Asians like Indians, Pakistanis, Bangladeshis and Sinhalese people cluster close to each other, but also closer to Europeans. In contrast Southeast Asians, East Asians and Africans were placed at a distant positions, outside the main cluster.

== mtDNA ==
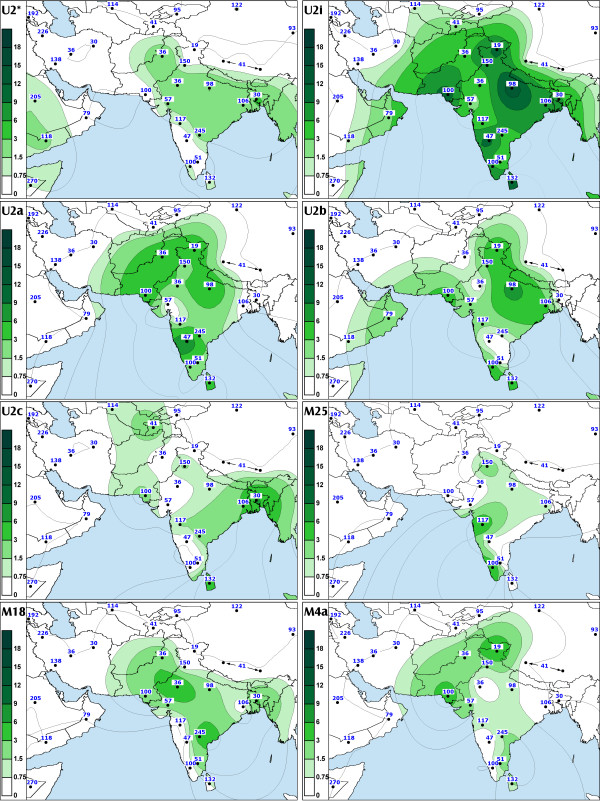
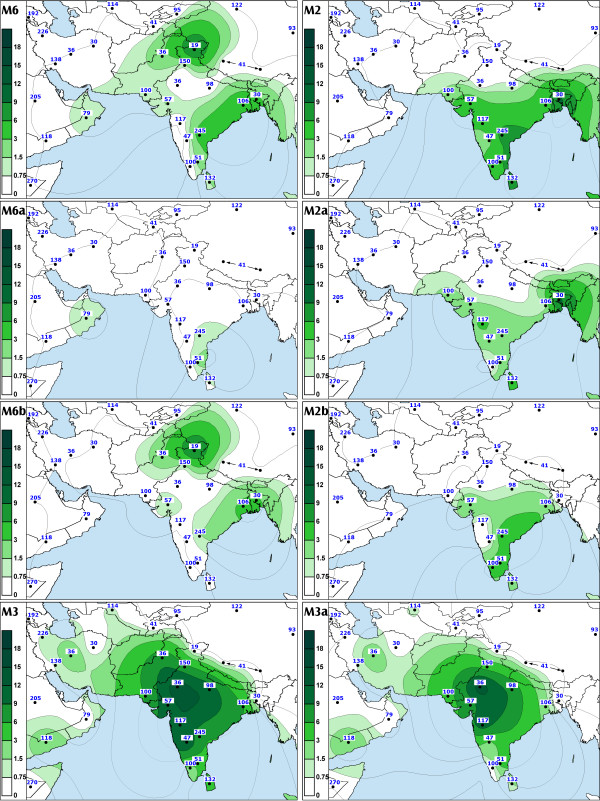
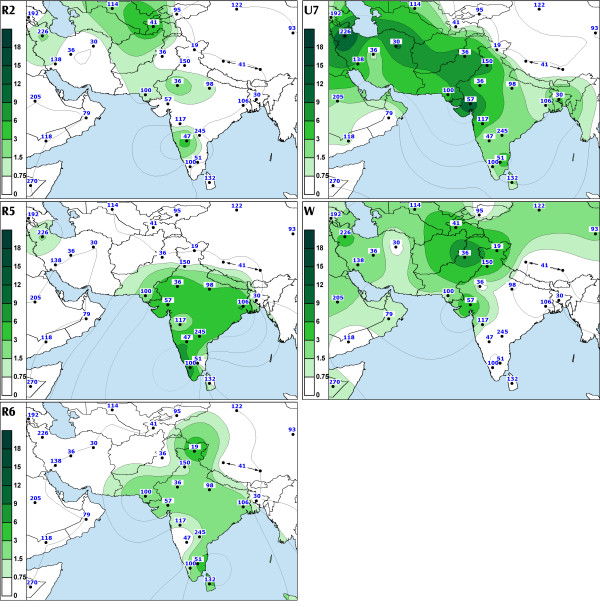
The spatial distribution of M, R and U mtDNA haplogroups and their sub-haplogroups in South Asia

The most frequent mtDNA haplogroups in South Asia are M, R and U (where U is a descendant of R). Arguing for the longer term "rival Y-Chromosome model", Stephen Oppenheimer believes that it is highly suggestive that India is the origin of the Eurasian mtDNA haplogroups which he calls the "Eurasian Eves". According to Oppenheimer it is highly probable that nearly all human maternal lineages in Central Asia, the Middle East and Europe descended from only four mtDNA lines that originated in South Asia 50,000–100,000 years ago.

=== Macrohaplogroup M ===
The macrohaplogroup M, which is considered as a cluster of the proto-Asian maternal lineages, represents more than 60% of South Asian MtDNA.

The M macrohaplotype in India includes many subgroups that differ profoundly from other sublineages in East Asia especially Mongoloid populations. The deep roots of M phylogeny clearly ascertain the relic of South Asian lineages as compared to other M sublineages (in East Asia and elsewhere) suggesting 'in-situ' origin of these sub-haplogroups in South Asia, most likely in India. These deep-rooting lineages are not language specific and spread over all the language groups in India.

Virtually all modern Central Asian MtDNA M lineages seem to belong to the Eastern Eurasian (Mongolian) rather than the South Asian subtypes of haplogroup M, which indicates that no large-scale migration from the present Turkic-speaking populations of Central Asia occurred to India. The absence of haplogroup M in Europeans, compared to its equally high frequency among South Asians, East Asians and in some Central Asian populations contrasts with the Western Eurasian leanings of South Asian paternal lineages.

Most of the extant mtDNA boundaries in South and Southwest Asia were likely shaped during the initial settlement of Eurasia by anatomically modern humans.

| Haplogroup | Important Sub clades | Populations |
|---|---|---|
| M2 | M2a, M2b | Throughout the continent with low presence in Northwest; Peaking in Bangladesh, Andhra Pradesh, coastal Tamil Nadu and Sri Lanka |
| M3 | M3a | Concentrated into northwestern India; Highest amongst the Parsees of Mumbai |
| M4 | M4a | Peaks in Pakistan, Kashmir and Andhra Pradesh |
| M6 | M6a, M6b | Kashmir and near the coasts of the Bay of Bengal, Sri Lanka |
| M18 | | Throughout South Asia; Peaking at Rajasthan and Andhra Pradesh |
| M25 | | Moderately frequent in Kerala and Maharashtra but rather infrequent elsewhere in India |

=== Macrohaplogroup R ===
The macrohaplogroup R (a very large and old subdivision of macrohaplogroup N) is also widely represented and accounts for the other 40% of South Asian MtDNA. A very old and most important subdivision of it is haplogroup U that, while also present in West Eurasia, has several subclades specific to South Asia.

Most important South Asian haplogroups within R:

| Haplogroup | Populations |
|---|---|
| R2 | Distributed widely across the sub continent |
| R5 | widely distributed in most of India. Peaks in coastal SW India |
| R6 | widespread at low rates across India. Peaks among Tamils and Kashmiris |
| W | Found in northwestern states. Peaks in Gujarat, Punjab and Kashmir, frequency is low elsewhere. |

==== Haplogroup U ====
Haplogroup U is a sub-haplogroup of macrohaplogroup R. The distribution of haplogroup U is a mirror image of that for haplogroup M: the former has not been described so far among eastern Asians but is frequent in European populations as well as among South Asians. South Asian U lineages differ substantially from those in Europe and their coalescence to a common ancestor also dates back to about 50,000 years.

| Haplogroup | Populations |
|---|---|
| U2* | (a parahaplogroup) is sparsely distributed specially in the northern half of the South Asia. It is also found in SW Arabia. |
| U2a | shows relatively high density in Pakistan and NW India but also in Karnataka, where it reaches its higher density. |
| U2b | has highest concentration in Uttar Pradesh but is also found in many other places, specially in Kerala and Sri Lanka. It is also found in Oman. |
| U2c | is specially important in Bangladesh and West Bengal. |
| U2i | is maybe the most important numerically among U subclades in South Asia, reaching specially high concentrations (over 10%) in Uttar Pradesh, Sri Lanka, Sindh and parts of Karnataka. It also has some importance in Oman. mtDNA haplogroup U2i is dubbed "Western Eurasian" in Bamshad et al. study but "Eastern Eurasian (mostly India specific)" in Kivisild et al. study. |
| U7 | this haplogroup has a significant presence in Gujarat, Punjab and Pakistan. The possible homeland of this haplogroup spans Gujarat (highest frequency, 12%) and Iran because from there its frequency declines steeply both to the east and to the west. |

== Y chromosome ==
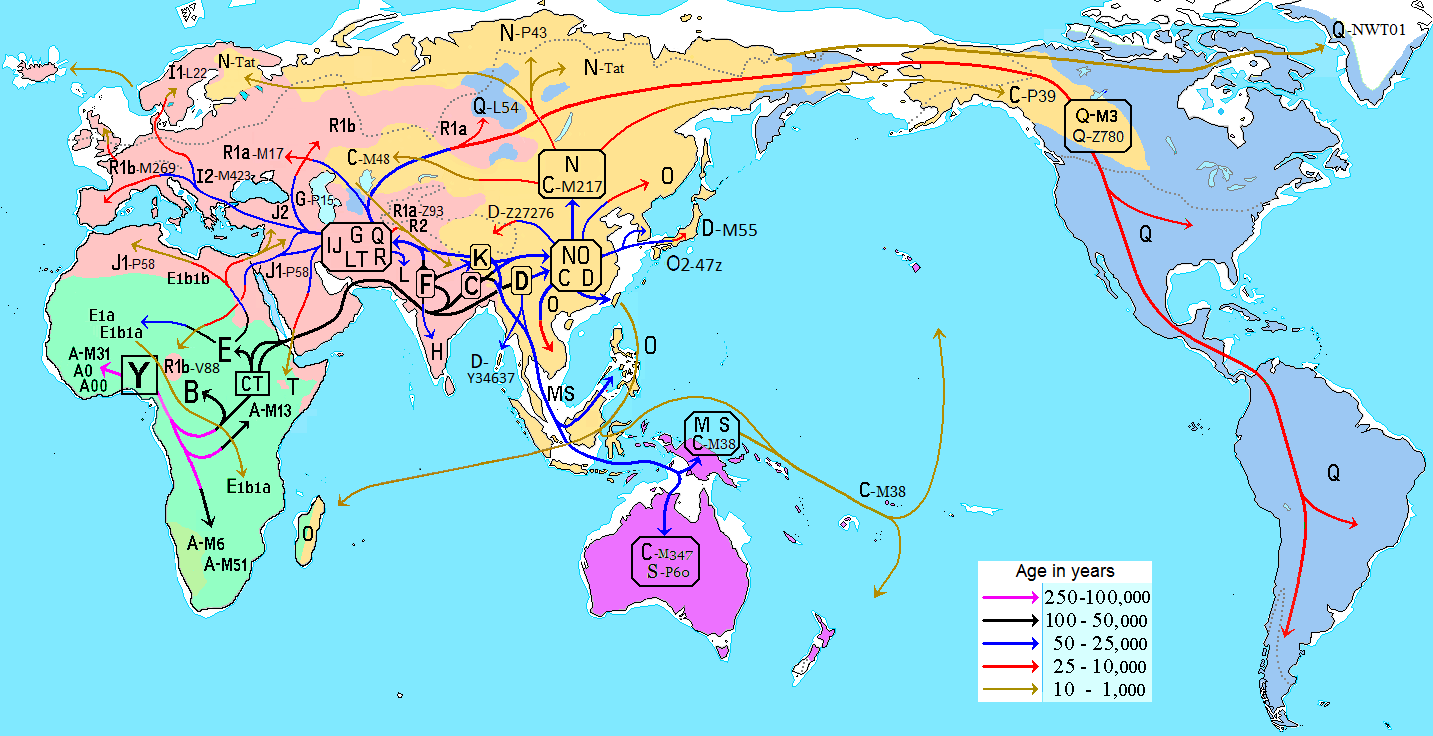
World map of early migrations of modern humans based on the Y-chromosome DNA

The major South Asian Y-chromosome DNA haplogroups are H, J2, L, R1a1, R2, which are commonly found among other West Eurasian populations, such as Middle Easterners or Europeans. Their geographical origins are listed as follows, according to the latest scholarship:

| Major South Asian Y-chromosomal lineages: | H H-L901 | J2 J-M172 | L L-M20 | R1a1a1 R-M417 | R2 R-M479 |
|---|---|---|---|---|---|
| Basu et al. (2003) | no comment | no comment | no comment | Central Asia | no comment |
| Kivisild et al. (2003) | India | Western Asia | India | Southern and Western Asia | South-Central Asia |
| Cordaux et al. (2004) | India | West or Central Asia | Middle Eastern | Central Asia | South-Central Asia |
| Sengupta et al. (2006) | India | The Middle East and Central Asia | South India | North India | North India |
| Thanseem et al. (2006) | India | The Levant | The Middle East | Southern and Central Asia | Southern and Central Asia |
| Sahoo et al. (2006) | South Asia | The Near East | South Asia | South or West Asia | South Asia |
| Mirabal et al. (2009) | no comment | no comment | no comment | Northwestern India or Central Asia | no comment |
| Zhao et al. (2009) | India | The Middle East | The Middle East | Central Asia or West Eurasia | Central Asia or West Eurasia |
| Sharma et al. (2009) | no comment | no comment | no comment | South Asia | no comment |
| Thangaraj et al. (2010) | South Asia | The Near East | The Near East | South Asia | South Asia |

=== Haplogroup H ===
Haplogroup H (Y-DNA) is found at a high frequency in South Asia and is considered to represent the major paternal lineage. H is today rarely found outside of South Asia, but is common among South Asian-descended populations, such as the Romanis, particularly the H-M82 subgroup. H was also found in some ancient samples of Europe and is still found today at a low frequency in certain southeastern Europeans and Arabs of the Levant. Haplogroup H is frequently found among populations of India, Sri Lanka, Nepal, Bangladesh, Pakistan and the Maldives. All three branches of Haplogroup H (Y-DNA) are found in South Asia.

Probable site of introduction; South Asia or West Asia or Southern Central Asia. It seems to represent the main Y-Chromosome haplogroup of the Paleolithic inhabitants of South Asia and Europe respectively. Some individuals in South Asia have also been shown to belong to the much rarer subclade H3 (Z5857). Haplogroup H is by no means restricted to specific populations. For example, H is possessed by about 28.8% of Indo-Aryan castes. and in tribals about 25–35%.

=== Haplogroup J2 ===
Haplogroup J2 has been present in South Asia mostly as J2a-M410 and J2b-M102, since Neolithic times (9500 YBP). J2 clades attain peak frequencies in the North-West and South India and is found at 19% within South Indian castes, 11% in North Indian castes and 12% in Pakistan. In South India, the presence of J2 is higher among middle castes at 21%, followed by upper castes at 18.6% and lower castes at 14%. Among caste groups, the highest frequency of J2-M172 is observed among Tamil Vellalars of South India, at 38.7%. J2 is present in tribals too and has a frequency of 11% in Austro-Asiatic tribals. Among the Austro-Asiatic tribals, the predominant J2 occurs in the Lodha (35%). J2 is also present in the South Indian hill tribe Toda at 38.46%, in the Andh tribe of Telangana at 35.19% and in the Kol tribe of Uttar Pradesh at a frequency of 33.34%. Haplogroup J-P209 was found to be more common in India's Shia Muslims, of which 28.7% belong to haplogroup J, with 13.7% in J-M410, 10.6% in J-M267 and 4.4% in J2b.

In Pakistan, the highest frequencies of J2-M172 were observed among the Parsis at 38.89%, the Dravidian-speaking Brahuis at 28.18% and the Makrani Balochs at 24%. It also occurs at 18.18% in Makrani Siddis and at 3% in Karnataka Siddis.

J2-M172 is found at an overall frequency of 10.3% among the Sinhalese people of Sri Lanka. In Maldives, 20.6% of Maldivian population were found to be haplogroup J2 positive.

=== Haplogroup L ===
According to Dr. Spencer Wells, L-M20 originated either in India or the Middle East, among the K-M9 descendants that migrated eastwards from the Middle East and later southwards from the Pamir Knot, before reaching India c. 30,000 years ago. Other studies have proposed either a West Asian or South Asian origin for L-M20 and associated its expansion in the Indus valley (~7,000 YBP) to Neolithic farmers. Genetic studies suggest that L-M20 may be one of the haplogroups of the original creators of the Indus Valley Civilisation. There are three subbranches of haplogroup L: L1-M76 (L1a1), L2-M317 (L1b) and L3-M357 (L1a2), found at varying levels in South Asia.

==== India ====
Haplogroup L shows time of Neolithic expansion. The clade is present in the Indian population at an overall frequency of c. 7–15%. Haplogroup L has a higher frequency among south Indian castes (c. 17–19%) and reaches 68% in some castes in Karnataka but is somewhat rarer in northern Indian castes (c. 5–6%). The presence of haplogroup L is quite rare among tribal groups (c. 5.6–7%); however, 14.6% has been observed among the Chenchus.

Among regional and social groups, moderate to high frequencies have been observed in Jats (36.8%), Konkanastha Brahmins (18.6%), Lambadis (17.1%), Punjabis (12.1%) and Gujaratis (10.4%).

==== Pakistan ====
In Pakistan, L1-M76 and L3-M357 subclades of L-M20 reach overall frequencies of 5.1% and 6.8%, respectively. Haplogroup L3 (M357) is found frequently among Burusho (approx. 12%) and Pashtuns (approx. 7%). Its highest frequency can be found in south western Balochistan province along the Makran coast (28%) to Indus River delta. L3a (PK3) is found in approximately 23% of Nuristani in northwest Pakistan.

The clade is present in moderate distribution among the general Pakistani population (14% approx).

==== Sri Lanka ====
In one study, 16% of the Sinhalese were found to be Haplogroup L-M20 positive. In another study 18% were found to belong to L1.

=== Haplogroup R1a1 ===
In South Asia, R1a1 has been observed often with high frequency in a number of demographic groups, as well as with highest STR diversity which lead some to see it as the locus of origin.

While R1a originated c. 22,000 to 25,000 years ago, its subclade M417 (R1a1a1) diversified c. 5,800 years ago. The distribution of M417-subclades R1-Z282 (including R1-Z280) in Central and Eastern Europe and R1-Z93 in Asia suggests that R1a1a diversified within the Eurasian Steppes or the Middle East and Caucasus region. The place of origin of these subclades plays a role in the debate about the origins of Indo-Europeans.

==== India ====
In India, a high percentage of this haplogroup is observed in West Bengal Brahmins (72%) to the east, Gujarat Lohanas (60%) to the west, Khatris (67%) in the north, and Karnataka Medars (39%) in the south. It has also been found in several South Indian Dravidian-speaking tribals including the Kotas (41%) of Tamil Nadu, Chenchu (26%) and Valmikis of Andhra Pradesh as well as the Yadav and Kallar of Tamil Nadu suggesting that M17 is widespread in these southern Indians tribes. Besides these, studies show high percentages in regionally diverse groups such as Manipuris (50%) to the extreme northeast and in among Punjabis (47%) to the extreme northwest.

==== Pakistan ====
In Pakistan, it is found at 71% among the Mohanna of Sindh Province to the south and 46% among the Baltis of Gilgit-Baltistan to the north.

==== Sri Lanka ====
20 of the Sinhalese people out of a sample of 87 subjects were found to be R1a1a (R-SRY1532) positive according to a 2003 research, while another research in the same year found 5 of 38 samples belonged to this specific haplogroup.

==== Maldives ====
In the Maldives, 23.8% of the Maldivian people were found to be R1a1a (M17) positive.

==== Nepal ====
People in Terai region, Nepal show R1a1a at 69%.

=== Haplogroup R2 ===
In South Asia, the frequency of R2 and R2a lineage is around 10–15% in India and Sri Lanka and 7–8% in Pakistan. At least 90% of R-M124 individuals are located in South Asia. It is also reported in Caucasus and Central Asia at a lower frequency. A genetic study by Mondal et al. in 2017 concluded that Haplogroup R2 originated in northern India and was already present before the Steppe migration. Though, some of the oldest samples were detected among Mesolithic and Neolithic individuals from Iranian Plateau and Turan.

==== India ====
Among regional groups, it is found among West Bengalis (23%), New Delhi Hindus (20%), Punjabis (5%) and Gujaratis (3%). Among tribal groups, the Karmali tribe of West Bengal showed highest at 100% followed by Lodhas (43%) to the east, while Bhil of Gujarat in the west were at 18%, Tharus of the north showed it at 17%, the Chenchu and Pallan of the south were at 20% and 14% respectively. Among caste groups, high percentages are shown by Jaunpur Kshatriyas (87%), Kamma (73%), Bihar Yadav (50%), Khandayat (46%)and Kallar (44%).

It is also significantly high in many Brahmin groups including Punjabi Brahmins (25%), Bengali Brahmins (22%), Konkanastha Brahmins (20%), Chaturvedis (32%), Bhargavas (32%), Kashmiri Pandits (14%) and Lingayat Brahmins (30%).

North Indian Muslims have a frequency of 19% (Sunni) and 13% (Shia), while Dawoodi Bohra Muslim in the western state of Gujarat have a frequency of 16% and Mappila Muslims of southern India have a frequency of 5%.

==== Pakistan ====
The R2 haplogroup is found in 14% of the Burusho people. Among the Hunza people it is found at 18% while the Parsis show it at 20%.

==== Sri Lanka ====
38% of the Sinhalese of Sri Lanka were found to have R2 according to a 2003 research.

==== Maldives ====
12% of the Maldivians are found to have R2.

==== Nepal ====
In Nepal, R2 percentages range from 2% to 26% within different groups under various studies. Newars show a significantly high frequency of 26% while people of Kathmandu show it at 10%.

=== Haplogroup O ===
Haplogroup O1 (O-F265) and O2 (O-M122), the primary branches of Haplogroup O-M175 are very common among the Austroasiatic and Tibeto-Burmese speaking populations of South Asia respectively.

Haplogroup O-M95, a subclade of O1-F265, is mainly restricted in Austroasiatic-speaking groups in South Asia. According to Kumar et al 2007, M95 averages at 55% in Munda and 41% of Khasi-Khmuic speakers of from Northeast India, while Reddy et al. 2007 found an average frequency 53% among Mundari and 31% among Khasi speakers. Zhang et al. 2015, found a higher average of 67.53% and 74,00% among Munda and Khasi-speaking groups respectively. Abundant in the Andaman and Nicobar Islands (averaging ~45%), it is fixed (100%) in some populations like Shompen, Onge and Nicobarese. A migration of O-M95 from Southeast Asia into India has been suggested with an expansion time of 5.2 ± 0.6 KYA in Northeast India.

Haplogroup O2-M122 is primarily found among the males of Tibeto-Burmese ancestry in the Himalayas and Northeast India. Haplogroup O-M122, believed to have originated in Southern China shows very high percentages. It is found at 86.6% among Tamangs of Nepal, with similarly high frequencies, 75% to 85%, among the northeastern Indian Tibeto-Burman groups, including Adi, Naga, Apatani, Nyishi, Kachari and Rabha. In Northeast India, Baric speakers display a high frequency and homogeneity of O-M134, indicating a population bottleneck effect that occurred during a westward and then southward migration of the founding population of Tibeto-Burmans during its branching from the parental population. It has a significant presence among the Khasis (29%), despite being generally absent in other Austroasiatics of India, and it shows up at 55% among neighbouring Garos, a Tibeto-Burman group.

== Reconstructing South Asian population history ==
The Indian Genome Variation Consortium, divides the population of South Asia into four ethnolinguistic (not genetic) groups: Indo-European, Dravidian, Tibeto-Burman and Austro-Asiatic. The molecular anthropology studies use three different type of markers: Mitochondrial DNA (mtDNA) variation which is maternally inherited and highly polymorphic, Y Chromosome variation which involves uniparental transmission along the male lines, and Autosomal DNA variation.

=== mtDNA variation ===
Most of the studies based on mtDNA variation have reported genetic unity of South Asian populations across language, caste and tribal groups. It is likely that haplogroup M was brought to Asia from East Africa along the southern route by earliest migration wave 78,000 years ago.

According to Kivisild et al. (1999), "Minor overlaps with lineages described in other Eurasian populations clearly demonstrate that recent immigrations have had very little impact on the innate structure of the maternal gene pool of South Asians. Despite the variations found within India, these populations stem from a limited number of founder lineages. These lineages were most likely introduced to South Asia during the Middle Palaeolithic, before the peopling of Europe 48,000 years ago and perhaps the Old World in general." Basu et al. (2003) also emphasises underlying unity of female lineages in India.

=== Y Chromosome variation ===
Conclusions based on Y Chromosome variation have been more varied than those based on mtDNA variation. While Kivisild et al. proposes an ancient and shared genetic heritage of male lineages in South Asia, Bamshad et al. (2001) suggests an affinity between South Asian male lineages and modern west Eurasians proportionate to upper-caste rank and places upper-caste populations of southern Indian states closer to East Europeans.

Basu et al. (2003) concludes that Austro–Asiatic tribal populations entered India first from the Northwest corridor and much later some of them through Northeastern corridor. Whereas, Kumar et al. (2007) analysed 25 South Asian Austro-Asiatic tribes and found a strong paternal genetic link among the sub-linguistic groups of the South Asian Austro-Asiatic populations. Mukherjee et al. (2001) places Pakistanis and North Indians between west Asian and Central Asian populations, whereas Cordaux et al. (2004) argues that the Indian caste populations are closer to Central Asian populations. Earlier studies like Sahoo et al. (2006) and Sengupta et al. (2006) suggested that Indian caste populations have not been subject to any recent admixtures.

Closest-neighbor analysis done by Mondal et al. in 2017 concluded that Indian Y-lineages are close to southern European populations and the time of divergence between the two at least in part predated Bronze-Age Steppe migration into India:

These results suggest that the European-related ancestry in Indian populations might be much older and more complex than anticipated, and might originate from the first wave of agriculturists or even earlier

— Mondal et al. 2017

=== Autosomal DNA variation ===
==== AASI-ANI-ASI ====
Results of studies based upon autosomal DNA variation have also been varied. In a major study (2009) using over 500,000 biallelic autosomal markers, Reich hypothesized that the modern South Asian population was the result of admixture between two genetically divergent ancestral populations dating from the post-Holocene era. These two "reconstructed" ancient populations he termed "Ancestral South Indians" (ASI) and "Ancestral North Indians" (ANI). According to Reich: "ANI ancestry is significantly higher in Indo-European than Dravidian speakers, suggesting that the ancestral ASI may have spoken a Dravidian language before mixing with the ANI." While the ANI is genetically close to Middle Easterners, Central Asians and Europeans, the ASI is not closely related to groups outside of the subcontinent. As no "ASI" ancient DNA is available, the indigenous Andamanese Onge are used as an (imperfect) proxy of ASI (according to Reich et al., the Andamanese, though distinct from them, are the closest living population to the ASI). According to Reich et al., both ANI and ASI ancestry are found all over the subcontinent (in both northern and southern India) in varying proportions, and that "ANI ancestry ranges from 39–71% in India, and is higher in traditionally upper caste and Indo-European speakers."

According to Gallego Romero et al. (2011), their research on lactose tolerance in India suggests that "the west Eurasian genetic contribution identified by Reich et al. (2009) principally reflects gene flow from Iran and the Middle East". Gallego Romero notes that Indians who are lactose-tolerant show a genetic pattern regarding this tolerance which is "characteristic of the common European mutation". According to Romero, this suggests that "the most common lactose tolerance mutation made a two-way migration out of the Middle East less than 10,000 years ago. While the mutation spread across Europe, another explorer must have brought the mutation eastward to India – likely traveling along the coast of the Persian Gulf where other pockets of the same mutation have been found."

Moorjani et al. 2013 state that the ASI, though not closely related to any living group, are "related (distantly) to indigenous Andaman Islanders." Moorjani et al. however suggest possible gene flow into the Andamanese from a population related to the ASI, causing the modelled relationship. The study concluded that "almost all groups speaking Indo-European or Dravidian languages lie along a gradient of varying relatedness to West-Eurasians in PCA (referred to as "Indian cline")".

A 2013 study by Chaubey using the single-nucleotide polymorphism (SNP), shows that the genome of Andamanese people (Onge) is closer to those of other Oceanic Negrito groups than to that of South Asians.

According to Basu et al. 2016, further analysis revealed that the genomic structure of mainland Indian populations is best explained by contributions from four ancestral components. In addition to the ANI and ASI, Basu et al. (2016) identified two East Asian ancestral components in mainland India that are major for the Austro-Asiatic-speaking tribals and the Tibeto-Burman speakers, which they denoted as AAA (for "Ancestral Austro-Asiatic") and ATB (for "Ancestral Tibeto-Burman") respectively. The study also infers that the populations of the Andaman Islands archipelago form a distinct ancestry, which "was found to be coancestral to Oceanic populations" but more distant from South Asians.

The cline of admixture between the ANI and ASI lineages is dated to the period of c. 4.2–1.9 kya by Moorjani et al. (2013), corresponding to the Indian Bronze Age, and associated by the authors with the process of deurbanisation of the Indus Valley civilisation and the population shift to the Gangetic system in the incipient Indian Iron Age. Basu et al. (2003) suggests that "Dravidian speakers were possibly widespread throughout India before the arrival of the Indo-European-speaking nomads" and that "formation of populations by fission that resulted in founder and drift effects have left their imprints on the genetic structures of contemporary populations". The geneticist PP Majumder (2010) has recently argued that the findings of Reich et al. (2009) are in remarkable concordance with previous research using mtDNA and Y-DNA:

Central Asian populations are supposed to have been major contributors to the Indian gene pool, particularly to the northern Indian gene pool, and the migrants had supposedly moved into India through what is now Afghanistan and Pakistan. Using mitochondrial DNA variation data collated from various studies, we have shown that populations of Central Asia and Pakistan show the lowest coefficient of genetic differentiation with the north Indian populations, a higher differentiation with the south Indian populations, and the highest with the northeast Indian populations. Northern Indian populations are genetically closer to Central Asians than populations of other geographical regions of India... . Consistent with the above findings, a recent study using over 500,000 biallelic autosomal markers has found a north to south gradient of genetic proximity of Indian populations to western Eurasians. This feature is likely related to the proportions of ancestry derived from the western Eurasian gene pool, which, as this study has shown, is greater in populations inhabiting northern India than those inhabiting southern India.

Chaubey et al. 2015 detected a distinctive East Asian ancestral component, mainly restricted to specific populations in the foothills of Himalaya and northeastern part of India. Highest frequency of the component is observed among the Tibeto-Burmese speaking groups of northeast India and was also detected in Andamanese populations at 32%, with substantial presence also among Austroasiatic speakers. It is found to be largely absent in Indo-European and Dravidian speakers, except in some specific ethnic groups living in the Himalayan foothills and central-south India. The researchers however suggested that the East Asian ancestry (represented by the Han) measured in the studied Andamanese groups may actually reflect the capture of the affinity of the Andamanese with Melanesians and Malaysian Negritos (rather than true East Asian admixture), as a previous study by Chaubey et al. suggested "a deep common ancestry" between Andamanese, Melanesians and other Negrito groups, and an affinity between Southeast Asian Negritos and Melanesians (as well as the Andamanese) with East Asians. Other studies also reveal varying degrees of admixture with Ancestral North Indian and Ancestral South Indian for Northeast Indians. Their East Asian-related ancestry is likewise more similar to Trans-Himalayan populations, who are situated between East and South Asia. However, there is evidence that Northeast India was initially populated by Dai-related Southern East Asians before mixing with Yakut-related Northern East Asians. Himalayan populations also show genetic differentiation, with Tibetan-related groups primarily descending from a Tibetan-related lineage, which can be modeled as a mixture of Late Neolithic Upper Yellow River-related ancestry (80–92%) and a deep lineage that is phylogenetically near the split between West and East Eurasian lineages (8–20%). Non-Tibetan Tibeto-Burman-related groups, such as Naga, Tamang, Gurung, Bhutanese etc., also descend from this Tibetan-related lineage but received additional inputs from Middle Neolithic Yellow River-related and mainland South Asian-related groups. Other studies found that Central and South Asian-related admixture peaks in populations from Nepal and Ladakh, except for groups like Sherpa.

Lazaridis et al. (2016) notes "The demographic impact of steppe related populations on South Asia was substantial, as the Mala, a south Indian Dalit population with minimal ANI (Ancestral North Indian) along the 'Indian Cline' of such ancestry is inferred to have ~ 18% steppe-related ancestry, while the Kalash of Pakistan are inferred to have ~ 50%, similar to present-day northern Europeans." The study estimated (6.5–50.2%) steppe-related admixture in South Asians. Lazaridis et al. further notes that "A useful direction of future research is a more comprehensive sampling of ancient DNA from steppe populations, as well as populations of central Asia (east of Iran and south of the steppe), which may reveal more proximate sources of the ANI than the ones considered here, and of South Asia to determine the trajectory of population change in the area directly.

Pathak et al. 2018 concluded that the Indo-European speakers of the Gangetic Plains and the Dravidian speakers have significant Yamnaya Early-Middle Bronze Age (Steppe_EMBA) ancestry but no Middle-Late Bronze Age Steppe (Steppe_MLBA) ancestry. On the other hand, the "North-Western Indian and Pakistani" populations (PNWI) showed significant Steppe_MLBA ancestry along with Yamnaya (Steppe_EMBA) ancestry. The study also noted that ancient South Asian samples had significantly higher Steppe_MLBA than Steppe_EMBA (or Yamnaya). The study also suggested that the Rors could be used as a proxy for the ANI.

David Reich in his 2018 book Who We Are and How We Got Here states that the 2016 analyses found the ASI to have significant amounts of an ancestry component deriving from Iranian farmers (about 25% of their ancestry), with the remaining 75% of their ancestry deriving from native South Asian hunter-gatherers. He adds that ASI were unlikely the local hunter-gatherers of South Asia as previously established, but a population responsible for spreading agriculture throughout South Asia. In the case of the ANI, the Iranian farmer ancestry is 50%, with the rest being from steppe groups related to the Yamnaya.

Narasimhan et al. (2018), similarly, conclude that ANI and ASI were formed in the 2nd millennium BCE. They were preceded by a mixture of AASI (ancient ancestral south Indian, i.e. hunter-gatherers sharing a distant root with the Andamanese, Australian Aboriginals, and East Asians); and Iranian agriculturalists who arrived in India c. 4700–3000 BCE, and "must have reached the Indus Valley by the 4th millennium BCE". According to Narasimhan et al., this mixed population, which probably was native to the Indus Valley Civilisation, "contributed in large proportions to both the ANI and ASI", which took shape during the 2nd millennium BCE. ANI formed out of a mixture of "Indus Periphery-related groups" and migrants from the steppe, while ASI was formed out of "Indus Periphery-related groups" who moved south and mixed further with local hunter-gatherers. The ancestry of the ASI population is suggested to have averaged about 73% from the AASI and 27% from Iranian-related farmers. Narasimhan et al. observe that samples from the Indus periphery group are always mixes of the same two proximal sources of AASI and Iranian agriculturalist-related ancestry; with "one of the Indus Periphery individuals having ~42% AASI ancestry and the other two individuals having ~14–18% AASI ancestry" (with the remainder of their ancestry being from the Iranian agriculturalist-related population). The authors propose that the AASI indigenous hunter-gatherers represent a divergent branch that split off around the same time that East Asian, Onge (Andamanese) and Australian Aboriginal ancestors separated from each other. It inferred, "essentially all the ancestry of present-day eastern and southern Asians (prior to West Eurasian-related admixture in southern Asians) derives from a single eastward spread, which gave rise in a short span of time to the lineages leading to AASI, East Asians, Onge, and Australians."

A genetic study by Yelmen et al. (2019) found that the native South Asian genetic component, termed the S-component, is distinct from the Andamanese, and that the Andamanese are an imperfect proxy for it. This component (when represented by the Andamanese Onge) was not detected in the northern Indian Gujarati samples, and hence they assumed that the South Indian tribal Paniya people (a group of predominantly ASI ancestry) would serve as a better source for the component in modern South Asians. However, unlike the Paniya samples, the S-component extracted from the tribal Irula samples were found to be devoid of any West Eurasian contribution, suggesting it to be a better representative of the native South Asian genetic component. Their improved results, based on "local ancestry deconvolution and masking of 500 samples from 25 South Asian populations via coalescent simulations", suggest that the AASI diverged from the common ancestor of Andamanese and East Asians shortly after these have diverged from West Eurasians. They also found that there were "multiple waves of West Eurasian arrival, as opposed to a simpler one wave scenario".

Two genetic studies (Narasimhan et al. 2019 & Shinde et al. 2019) analysing remains from the Indus Valley civilisation (of parts of Bronze Age Northwest India and East Pakistan), found them to have a mixture of ancestry, both from native South Asian hunter-gatherers sharing a distant root with the Andamanese, and from a group related to Iranian farmers. The samples analysed by Shinde derived about 50–98% of their genome from Iranian-related peoples and from 2–50% from native South Asian hunter-gatherers. The samples analysed by Narasimhan et al. had 45–82% of Iranian farmer-related ancestry and 11–50% of South Asian hunter-gatherer origin. The analysed samples of both studies have little to none of the "Steppe ancestry" component associated with later Indo-European migrations into India. The authors found that the respective amounts of those ancestries varied significantly between individuals, and concluded that more samples are needed to get the full picture of Indian population history.

==== Genetic distance between caste groups and tribes ====
Studies by Watkins et al. (2005) and Kivisild et al. (2003) based on autosomal markers conclude that Indian caste and tribal populations have a common ancestry. Reddy et al. (2005) found fairly uniform allele frequency distributions across caste groups of southern Andhra Pradesh, but significantly larger genetic distance between caste groups and tribes indicating genetic isolation of the tribes and castes.

Viswanathan et al. (2004) in a study on genetic structure and affinities among tribal populations of southern India concludes,

Genetic differentiation was high and genetic distances were not significantly correlated with geographic distances. Genetic drift therefore probably played a significant role in shaping the patterns of genetic variation observed in southern Indian tribal populations. Otherwise, analyses of population relationships showed that all Indian and South Asian populations are still similar to one another, regardless of phenotypic characteristics, and do not show any particular affinities to Africans. We conclude that the phenotypic similarities of some Indian groups to Africans do not reflect a close relationship between these groups, but are better explained by convergence.

A 2011 study published in the American Journal of Human Genetics indicates that Indian ancestral components are the result of a more complex demographic history than was previously thought. According to the researchers, South Asia harbours two major ancestral components, one of which is spread at comparable frequency and genetic diversity in populations of Central Asia, West Asia and Europe; the other component is more restricted to South Asia. However, if one were to rule out the possibility of a large-scale Indo-Aryan migration, these findings suggest that the genetic affinities of both Indian ancestral components are the result of multiple gene flows over the course of thousands of years.

Modeling of the observed haplotype diversities suggests that both Indian ancestry components are older than the purported Indo-Aryan invasion 3,500 YBP. Consistent with the results of pairwise genetic distances among world regions, Indians share more ancestry signals with West than with East Eurasians.

Narasimhan et al. 2019 found Austroasiatic-speaking Munda tribals could not be modelled simply as mixture of ASI, AASI, or ANI ancestry unlike other South Asians but required additional ancestry component from Southeast Asia. They were modelled as mixture of 64% AASI, and 36% East Asian-related ancestry, represented by the Nicobarese, thus the ancestry profile of the Mundas provides an independent line of ancestry from Southeast Asia around the 3rd millennium BCE. Lipson et al. 2018 found similar admixture results in regard to Munda tribals stating "we obtained a good fit with three ancestry components: one western Eurasian, one deep eastern Eurasian (interpreted as an indigenous South Asian lineage), and one from the Austroasiatic clade". Lipson et al. 2018 further found that the Austroasiatic source clad (proportion 35%) in Munda tribals was inferred to be closest to Mlabri. Singh et al. 2020 similarly found Austroasiatic speakers in South Asia fall out of the South Asian cline due to their Southeast Asian genetic affinity.

Origin of caste endogamy in India

Tournebize et al. analyse founder events spread across the world and write:

Our direct estimates of founder ages provide an independent line of evidence to understand the origin of endogamy in India. We inferred that these founder events occurred between ~120–3,500 years ago across 78 ethno-linguistic groups in India. Our dates are consistent with a previous smaller survey including 13 ethno-linguistic groups from India [18]. In a majority of the populations, the founder events occurred within the past 600–1,000 years, suggesting this period was integral to shaping endogamy in India.

== See also ==
- Archaeogenetics
- Ethnic groups of South Asia
- Peopling of India
- Y-DNA haplogroups in populations of South Asia
- MtDNA haplogroups in populations of South Asia
- Genetic studies on Gujarati people
- Genetic studies on Sinhalese
- Genetic history of East Asians
- Genetic history of Europe
- Genetic history of the Middle East
- Genetic history of Southeast Asia
