= Michael Berenbaum =

American scholar, author, historian and rabbi (born 1945)

- Born: July 31, 1945 (age 81); Newark, New Jersey, U.S.
- Education: Florida State University; Queens College
- Employer: American Jewish University
- Spouse: Melissa Patack Berenbaum
- Children: 4

Michael Berenbaum (born July 31, 1945) is an American scholar, professor, rabbi, writer, and filmmaker, who specializes in the study of the Holocaust. He served as deputy director of the President's Commission on the Holocaust (1979–1980), Project Director of the United States Holocaust Memorial Museum (USHMM) (1988–1993), and Director of the USHMM's Holocaust Research Institute (1993–1997).

Berenbaum played a leading role in the creation of the USHMM and the content of its permanent exhibition. From 1997 to 1999, he served as president and CEO of the Survivors of the Shoah Visual History Foundation, and subsequently (and currently) as Director of the Sigi Ziering Institute: Exploring the Ethical and Religious Implications of the Holocaust, located at the American Jewish University (formerly known as the University of Judaism), in Los Angeles, California.

== Professional career ==
Berenbaum, who is Jewish, was born in Newark, New Jersey. He graduated from Queens College with a Bachelor of Arts degree in 1967 and received his doctorate from Florida State University in 1975. He also attended The Hebrew University, the Jewish Theological Seminary and Boston University. Berenbaum received Rabbinic ordination (Orthodox) by Rabbi Yaakov Rabin at the age of 23. Berenbaum held teaching posts at Florida State University, Yale University, Georgetown University, Wesleyan University, George Washington University, the University of Maryland, College Park, and American University, and is currently a Professor of Jewish Studies at the American Jewish University (Los Angeles).

He is the author and editor of eighteen books, including After Tragedy and Triumph, a study of the state of American Jewry in the early 1990s, as well as The World Must Know: The History of the Holocaust, and Anatomy of the Auschwitz Death Camp. He co-edited After The Passion is Gone: American Religious Consequences, an examination of the social impact of the film After the Passion is Gone, with Shawn Landres (2004). Berenbaum and Landres took a public role in shaping the interreligious response to the film.

Berenbaum was the Executive Editor of the Second edition of the New Encyclopedia Judaica, which comprised 25,000 entries over 22 volumes. It won the Dartmouth Medal of the American Library Association for outstanding reference work for the year 2006.

Berenbaum co-produced One Survivor Remembers: The Gerda Weissmann Klein Story, a film which was recognized with an Academy Award, an Emmy Award, and the Cable ACE Award. He was the chief historical consultant for Last Days, which also won an Academy Award in 1998. In 2001, Berenbaum was historical consultant for the History Channel's The Holocaust: The Untold Story, which won the CINE Golden Eagle Award and a silver medal at the US International Film and Video Festival. He was also Executive Producer of a film entitled Desperate Hours about the unique and rarely acknowledged role The Republic of Turkey played in rescuing Jews from Nazi Germany's final solution and "About Face: The Story of The Jewish Refugee Soldiers of WWII." Berenbaum was executive producer of Swimming in Auschwitz and was a consultant for Defiance and Uprising, among other Holocaust-related films and documentaries.

Berenbaum is the founding partner of Berenbaum Jacobs Associates, a firm that designs museums, special exhibitions, memorials and educational centers.

In 2019 and 2020 he served as a history consultant for the Serbian historical drama film Dara of Jasenovac.

== Personal life ==
Berenbaum's wife is Melissa Patack Berenbaum. Berenbaum is the father of four children: Rabbi Ilana Berenbaum Grinblat, Phillip Lev Berenbaum, Joshua Boaz Berenbaum, and Mira Leza Berenbaum.

He is the model for the character Monty Pincus in Tova Reich’s 2007 satirical novel My Holocaust.
