= ADMIXTOOLS =

Population genetics software package

- Original authors: Nick Patterson; David Reich
- Developers: Robert Maier; David Reich Lab
- Release: 2012; 14 years ago
- Stable release: ADMIXTOOLS: 8.0.2 / September 6, 2024; 2 years ago ADMIXTOOLS 2: 2.0.4 / March 3, 2024; 2 years ago
- Preview release: ADMIXTOOLS 2: 2.1.0 / June 28, 2026; 4 months ago
- Written in: C, C++, R
- Operating system: Windows, Linux, macOS
- Platform: ARM, x86-64
- Available in: English
- Type: Population genetics
- License: open-source
- Website: uqrmaie1.github.io/admixtools/
- Repository: github.com/DReichLab/AdmixTools

ADMIXTOOLS (or AdmixTools) is a software package that is used mostly to analyze admixture in population genetics. The original version was developed as a set of standalone C programs by Nick Patterson and colleagues and published in 2012. A reimplemented version, ADMIXTOOLS 2, was developed as an R package by Robert Maier and colleagues and published in 2023.

Most ADMIXTOOLS programs are based on fitting demographic models to f-statistics, which are calculated from population allele frequencies.

== qpGraph ==
qpGraph is a software program that is part of the ADMIXTOOLS software package developed by Patterson et al. (2012). qpGraph evaluates graph-based models of population relationships with genetic admixture. It estimates likelihoods of graphs with a fixed topology, while adjusting graph parameters to fit observed f-statistics.

ADMIXTOOLS 2 adds functions to find optimized graph topologies, similar to programs like Treemix and OrientAGraph.

== Other tools ==
Related statistical tools in the ADMIXTOOLS software package include qpAdm, qpfst, qpF4ratio, qp3Pop, qpBound, qpDstat, and qpWave. qpDstat and qpWave test whether populations form clades, while qpAdm estimates ancestry proportions. qpAdm is often used in conjunction with CP/NNLS.

== See also ==
- SplitsTree
- Dendroscope
- List of phylogenetics software
