= David Reich Lab =

Research laboratory at Harvard Medical School in Boston, Massachusetts, U.S.

- Director: David Reich
- Location: Boston, Massachusetts, United States
- Affiliations: Harvard Medical School, Broad Institute
- Website: reich.hms.harvard.edu

The David Reich Lab is a research laboratory located within the Department of Genetics at Harvard Medical School in Boston, Massachusetts. Led by population geneticist David Reich, the lab is known for industrializing the fields of ancient DNA, population genetics, and human evolutionary genetics. As of 2020 it had produced the majority of the published data for research into ancient DNA.

== Overview ==
The lab was established by David Reich, a professor at Harvard Medical School and an investigator at the Howard Hughes Medical Institute. It focuses on analyzing ancient and modern human DNA to better understand population migrations, ancestry, and human evolution. The lab works closely with the Broad Institute of MIT and Harvard and collaborates with researchers in archaeology, anthropology, linguistics, and genomics across the globe. Its aim is to create an "Ancient DNA Atlas of Humanity".

== Research Areas ==
Major areas of focus include:

- Ancient DNA: Recovery and analysis of DNA from ancient human remains.
- Human evolution: Study of interactions between modern humans and archaic hominins such as Neanderthals and Denisovans.
- Population genetics: Analysis of genetic variation to reconstruct historical demographic events.
- Computational genomics: Development of statistical and bioinformatic methods to analyze degraded DNA.

== Major Contributions ==
The lab has made significant contributions to the understanding of global human history, including:

- Revealing complex patterns of migration into Europe and South Asia.
- Mapping population histories across regions such as Africa, Eurasia, Oceania, and the Americas.
- Contributing to the study of the spread of Indo-European languages using ancient DNA.

== Criticism ==
In 2019, David Reich faced criticism following a New York Times Magazine article that highlighted his lab's prominent role in ancient DNA research. Critics argued that the Reich Lab's rapid expansion and accumulation of ancient DNA samples led to concerns about monopolization of resources and underrepresentation of non-Western collaborators in research publications. Additionally, some scholars expressed unease over the lab's interpretations of genetic data, suggesting that certain conclusions might oversimplify complex population histories. There is apprehension that such interpretations could inadvertently support outdated or harmful narratives about human populations.
