= CP/NNLS =

CP/NNLS, standing for "ChromoPainter (CP) non-negative least squares (NNLS)" is a statistical method used in genetics. "ChromoPainter" is the name of a tool for finding haplotypes in sequence data, in which each individual is "painted" as a combination of all other sequences. It is used in Principal Components Analysis (PCA) to create data summaries, or dating admixture events. Non-negative least squares (NNLS) is a kind of regression analysis, which aims at finding the best possible correlation between a large set of dependent variables. It here used within the functionalities of ChromoPainter.

CP/NNLS is often used in conjunction with qpAdm.
