= Walter Reich =

American magazine editor, psychiatrist, and writer

- Born: July 6, 1943 (age 83)
- Spouse: Tova Reich
- Children: 3 children including David Reich
- Writing career
- Genre: Non-fiction
- Notable awards: AAAS Award for Scientific Freedom and Responsibility

Walter Reich is an American magazine editor, psychiatrist, and writer. He was the 2003 recipient of the AAAS Award for Scientific Freedom and Responsibility.

== Appointments ==
In the past, Reich held the roles of director of the U.S. Holocaust Memorial Museum, located in Washington, D.C. – ensuring its establishment as an educational institute with serious scholarship; at Yale University, located in New Haven, Connecticut; a resident in psychiatry, working at the National Institute of Mental Health, located in Washington, D.C.; and is a co-chair of the Committee of Concerned Scientists, located in New York City, New York.

As of 2015, he held the positions of: Yitzhak Rabin Memorial Professor of International Affairs, Ethics and Human Behavior at the George Washington University, located in Washington, D.C.; a contributing editor of The Wilson Quarterly; senior scholar at the Woodrow Wilson International Center for Scholars, located in Washington, D.C.; a lecturer in psychiatry at Yale University; and a professor of psychiatry at the Uniformed Services University of the Health Sciences, located in Bethesda, Maryland. He was a fellow of the Kennan Institute for Advanced Russian Studies of the Woodrow Wilson International Center for Scholars.

== Awards ==
In 2003–2004, Reich received the AAAS Award for Scientific Freedom and Responsibility. He has also received the Solomon A. Berson Medical Alumni Achievement Award in Health Science from the New York University School of Medicine.

== Publications ==
Reich wrote A Stranger in My House: Jews and Arabs in the West Bank (published by Holt), co-wrote State of the Struggle: Report on the Battle Against Global Terrorism (published by Brookings Institution Press), and edited Origins of Terrorism: Psychologies, Ideologies, Theologies, States of Mind (co-published by Johns Hopkins University Press and Woodrow Wilson Center Press). He has also contributed to various publications, including:

- The New York Times
- The Washington Post
- The Los Angeles Times
- The Wall Street Journal
- The Atlantic Monthly
- Harper's
- Commentary
- The New Republic

== Family ==
Reich is married to novelist Tova Reich (Sister of Rabbi Avi Weiss). They have three children, among them archaeogeneticist David Reich.

== See also ==
- List of George Washington University faculty
- List of people from Maryland
- List of people from Washington, D.C.
- List of psychiatrists
- List of Yale University people
