= David B. Goldstein (geneticist) =

American geneticist

- Alma mater: Stanford University; University of California, Los Angeles
- Awards: Fellow of the American Association for the Advancement of Science (2013); Royal Society Wolfson Fellowship (2001)
- Website: www.igm.columbia.edu/people-labs/labs/goldstein-lab
- Academic career
- Fields: Human genetics
- Institutions: Columbia University; University College London (1999–2005); Duke University (2005–2014)
- Thesis: Applications of theoretical population genetics to ploidy level evolution and phylogenetic reconstruction
- Doctoral advisor: Marcus Feldman
- Doctoral students: David Reich

David Benjamin Goldstein is an American human geneticist. Goldstein is founding Director of the Institute for Genomic Medicine at the Columbia University Medical Center, Professor of Genetics and Development and directs the genomics core of Epi4K and administrative cores of Epi4K with Dan Lowenstein and Sam Berkovic.

== Education ==
Goldstein received a Bachelors in biology from the University of California, Los Angeles. He then trained in theoretical population genetics at Stanford University (PhD 1994), where he worked with Marcus Feldman and Luca Cavalli-Sforza.

== Career ==
From 1996 to 1999, Goldstein was a lecturer at University of Oxford. He served as the Wolfson Professor of Genetics, University College London from 1999 to 2005. In 2005, Goldstein became the Richard and Pat Johnson Distinguished University Professor of Genetics, Microbiology, and Biology at Duke University. In 2014, he became the John E. Borne Professor of Medical and Surgical Research at Columbia University Medical Center where he served as the Director of Institute for Genomic Medicine. As of 2024, he is co-founder and CEO of Actio Biosciences.

== Research ==
Goldstein's primary research interests include human genetic diversity, the genetics of disease, and pharmacogenetics. The Goldstein group and collaborators have discovered a number of disease causing genes and syndromes, in particular in neurological and infectious diseases including:

- The role of IL28B in response to treatment for Hepatitis C infection in collaboration with John McHutchison and others.
- Identification of ATP1A3 as the gene responsible for Alternating Hemiplegia of Childhood in collaboration with Erin Heinzen and others.
- Discovery of NGLY1 deficiency as a new syndrome in collaboration with Vandana Shashi, Anna Need, and others.
- New genes for epileptic encephalopathies as part of the Epi4K Consortium.

== Awards and service ==
Goldstein was elected a fellow of AAAS in 2013, received the University of North Carolina at Chapel Hill IPIT award for clinical services in 2012, and was a recipient of one of the first seven nationally awarded Royal Society / Wolfson research merit awards in the UK for his work in human population genetics. In 2013, Goldstein chaired the Gordon Research Conference in Human Genetics, and he is currently serving on the Advisory Council at the National Institute of Neurological Disorders and Stroke at NIH.

== Selected publications ==
- Ge, D.; Fellay, J.; Thompson, A. J.; Simon, J. S.; Shianna, K. V.; Urban, T. J.; Heinzen, E. L.; Qiu, P.; Bertelsen, A. H.; Muir, A. J.; Sulkowski, M.; McHutchison, J. G.; Goldstein, D. B. (2009). "Genetic variation in IL28B predicts hepatitis C treatment-induced viral clearance". Nature. 461 (7262): 399–401. Bibcode:2009Natur.461..399G. doi:10.1038/nature08309. PMID 19684573. S2CID 1707096.
- Heinzen, E. L.; Swoboda, K. J.; Hitomi, Y.; Gurrieri, F.; Nicole, S.; De Vries, B.; Tiziano, F. D.; Fontaine, B.; Walley, N. M.; Heavin, S. A.; Panagiotakaki, E.; Nicole, S.; Gurrieri, F.; Neri, G.; Fiori, B.; Abiusi, S.; Di Pietro, J.; Sweney, M.; Newcomb, N.; Viollet, L.; Huff, J.; Jorde, M.; Reyna, A.; Murphy, C.; Shianna, M. T.; Gumbs, F.; Little, R.; Silver, M.; Ptáček, G.; et al. (2012). "De novo mutations in ATP1A3 cause alternating hemiplegia of childhood". Nature Genetics. 44 (9): 1030–1034. doi:10.1038/ng.2358. PMC 3442240. PMID 22842232.
- Need, A. C.; Shashi, V.; Hitomi, Y.; Schoch, K.; Shianna, K. V.; McDonald, M. T.; Meisler, M. H.; Goldstein, D. B. (2012). "Clinical application of exome sequencing in undiagnosed genetic conditions". Journal of Medical Genetics. 49 (6): 353–361. doi:10.1136/jmedgenet-2012-100819. PMC 3375064. PMID 22581936.
- Allen, A. S.; Epilepsy Phenome/Genome, S. F.; Allen, P.; Berkovic, N.; Cossette, D.; Delanty, E. E.; Dlugos, M. P.; Eichler, T.; Epstein, D. B.; Glauser, Y.; Goldstein, E. L.; Han, Y.; Heinzen, K. B.; Hitomi, M. R.; Howell, R.; Johnson, D. H.; Kuzniecky, Y. F.; Lowenstein, M. R. Z.; Lu, A. G.; Madou, H. C.; Marson, S.; Mefford, T. J.; Esmaeeli Nieh, R.; O'Brien, S.; Ottman, A.; Petrovski, E. K.; Poduri, I. E.; Ruzzo, E. H.; Scheffer, C. J.; Sherr, B. (2013). "De novo mutations in epileptic encephalopathies". Nature. 501 (7466): 217–221. Bibcode:2013Natur.501..217E. doi:10.1038/nature12439. PMC 3773011. PMID 23934111.
