= Who We Are and How We Got Here =

2018 book by David Reich

- First edition
- Author: David Reich
- Subject: Human population genetics
- Genre: Popular science
- Publisher: Oxford University Press
- Publication date: 2018
- ISBN: 978-0-19-882125-0

Who We Are and How We Got Here is a 2018 book on the contribution of genome-wide ancient DNA research to human population genetics by the geneticist David Reich. He describes discoveries made by his group and others, based on analysis and comparison of ancient and modern DNA from human populations around the world. Central to these is the finding that almost all human populations are mixtures resulting from multiple population migrations and gene flow.

Several reviewers have praised the book for clearly describing pioneering work in a cutting-edge field of study. It has been criticized by numerous scientists and scholars for its handling of race, while others argue that nothing in the book supports racist conclusions.

== Context ==
David Reich is a geneticist who has studied ancient human genomes, comparing their patterns of mutations to discover which populations migrated and mixed throughout prehistory. He was mentored by the population geneticist Luca Cavalli-Sforza, who from 1960 pioneered the attempt to match the study of human prehistory by archaeology and linguistics, using the limited genetic data available at that time.

== Publication ==
The book was published by Oxford University Press in 2018. Although it is credited to David Reich alone, he explains in the acknowledgements that the book grew from a detailed collaboration with his wife Eugenie Reich.

The book is illustrated with monochrome maps, diagrams, and timelines. There are no photographs.

== Summary ==
Since 2010, population geneticists have been able to sequence ancient human DNA, recovering complete genomes, in contrast to earlier approaches which relied on the far more abundant (and hence more easily recovered) mitochondrial DNA, which is present in many copies in each cell, and transmitted only via the maternal line. That early work gave what Reich calls the "exciting" result that all modern humans are related to "Mitochondrial Eve", a woman who lived in Africa only about 160,000 years ago.

The whole genome recovery technique, using the especially hard bone from the inner ear of ancient skeletons — along with the genomes of modern people from different parts of the world, including especially some isolated human populations — has made it possible to reconstruct prehistoric migrations and mixing of populations in the past 5,000 years, and to make reliable inferences about mixtures from much further back in time. Reich's laboratory at Harvard Medical School has led to an industrialisation of ancient genome recovery and this new knowledge from genomics has overthrown many old assumptions about human origins.

The book is in three parts, the first dealing with the background to what he calls the ancient DNA revolution as well as the interbreeding between archaic and modern humans, the second dealing with the role that this revolution has in illuminating the constituents of various current major populations and a final section looking at the implications of the new techniques.

=== Human Migrations ===
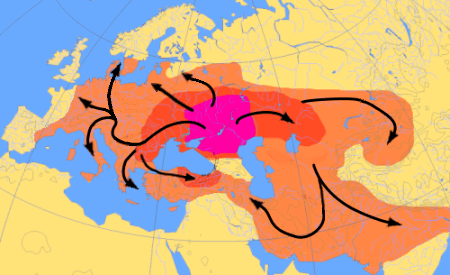
Kurgan model of Indo-European migrations from c. 4000 to 1000 BC. Magenta: origin; red: up to 2500 BC; orange: by 1000 BC

The second section of the book focusses on various large human migrations. Reich observes that migrations and population mixtures similar to the spread of Indo-European languages characterise human prehistory on all continents.

Much of the work has focused on Western Eurasia, where in 1786 Sir William Jones discovered that Sanskrit and ancient Greek were related languages. Linguists came to recognise the Indo-European family of languages, spanning Germanic, Celtic, Italic, Iranian and northern Indian languages, but without explaining how these came to be. Reich showed that modern populations in Europe and north India derive from mixing of native populations with Yamnaya people from the steppes north of the Black Sea and the Caspian Sea some 5,000 years ago, in separate migrations to the west and the east. The Corded ware culture, an archaeological horizon dated to c.3000-2350 BC and spanning most of Central and Eastern Europe, corresponds to a stage in the westward migration. In the book, Reich disputed the idea that Indo-European languages originated in Anatolia due to a lack of genetic similarity with the steppe Yamnaya culture, instead suggesting the languages may have originated south of the Caucasus, in present-day Iran or Armenia and spit into two branches with one going to the steppe and one to Anatolia.

Reich shows that people in Japan and Korea share some 80% of their DNA, implying migration; Polynesians migrated relatively recently, in just the past few thousand years, from the region of Taiwan. The evidence can upset long-held beliefs: Native American skeletons from 10,000 years ago do not appear to be related to the tribes living in those regions today who have been asking for the ancient bones to be returned to them for burial.

Reich argues that genetic evidence showed that West Asian geneflow into modern populations in Ethiopia and Somalia, particularly speakers of Afroasiatic languages, could support a diffusion of these languages from the Middle East.

The anthropologist John Hawks, writing in the Wall Street Journal, observes that Reich was surprised that the "concordance of near-mythological history with genetic fact" in the migrations in India was "a potential political bombshell"; he notes that Reich avoided it by not talking about "Indo-European invaders at all", writing only that "No group in India can claim genetic purity".

== Reception ==
The author and intellectual Jared Diamond, in the New York Times, notes that geneticists can now go far beyond studying the personal ancestries of participants in National Geographic's Genographic Project, which looked at small sections of their parents' DNA, namely their mother's mitochondrial DNA and their father's Y chromosome. By looking at DNA from ancient bones, Reich can recover whole genomes. Diamond warns readers not to expect an oversimplified story:

Population genetics is a complicated, fast-moving field with many uncertainties of interpretation. To tell that story to the broad public, and not just to scientists reading specialty journals, is a big challenge. Reich explains these complications as well as any geneticist could; others rarely even try.

Clive Cookson, in the Financial Times, writes that one of the first and most surprising impacts of genomics is in human prehistory, and Reich is the first leading practitioner to write a popular book about this. Cookson calls the book

a marvelous synthesis of the field: the technology for purifying and decoding DNA from old bones; what the findings tell us about the origins and movements of people on every inhabited continent; and the ethical and political implications of the research.

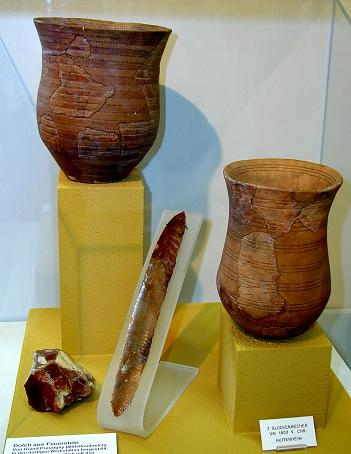
Bell-shaped Beaker pots, found in Western Europe c. 2900–1800 BC

The archaeologist and geneticist Turi King, in Nature, writes that Reich's laboratory "has developed some of the most sophisticated statistical and bioinformatics techniques available. Using computers, they painstakingly reconstruct genomic information from fragments of DNA from ancient individuals. They then drill down in search of a new understanding of human history." King notes that Reich's group helped to show that "Neanderthals interbred with the ancestors of all modern humans descended from Europeans, Asians and other non-Africans." Their work is showing the "tremendous degree to which populations globally are blended, repeatedly, over generations."

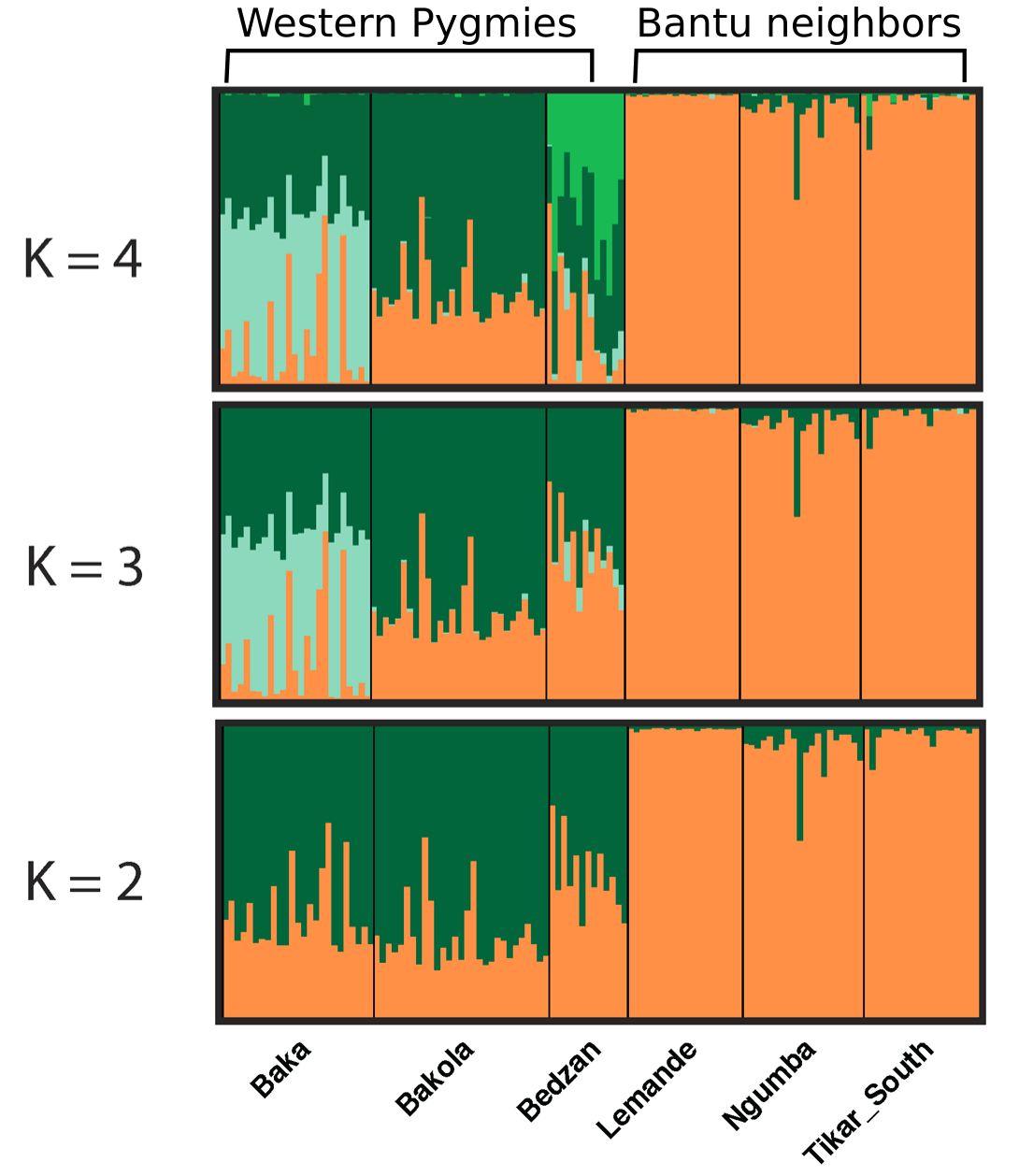
Admixture plot of Western African Pygmies and their Bantu neighbours. This shows that Pygmy populations contain substantial amounts of Bantu genetic material, whereas Bantu populations have very little Pygmy ancestry.

A review by Razib Khan, who is cited in the book, recommends the book to a wide audience, stating that it "catches [one] up to the state-of-the-art knowledge that we have in terms of human history, deep and prehistoric." He includes experts in that audience: "I’ve talked to plenty of people who work in evolutionary genomics who are not totally up-to-speed on the ancient DNA revolution. They too would benefit from reading Who We Are and How We Got Here front to back. I know people who work in the field of cultural evolution, who would also benefit from reading Who We Are and How We Got Here. I know behavior geneticists who would benefit from reading Who We Are and How We Got Here. And so forth." Khan concedes that the book "is not rich with the same stylistic flourish and engagement as one might find in a popularization by Steven Pinker or Richard Dawkins" but that it is a "serious book that is earnest in focusing on the substance of the science first."

The paleogenomics researcher María C. Ávila Arcos, reviewing the book in Science magazine, writes that "troubling traces of biocolonialism undermine an otherwise eloquent synthesis of ancient genome research." She calls Reich's account graceful, combining his personal opinions with "hard science" (Reich's phrase). She accepts that the book is "scientifically solid and comprehensive", but argues that it "raises some concerns", since in her view Reich overlooks the conflict of interest between the needs of researchers to gather ancient human DNA specimens and the rights of the often marginalised populations that descend from those ancestors.

The anthropologist John Hawks, writing in the Wall Street Journal, views Reich as "a contradiction: Rising to the pinnacle of human genetics, he nonetheless exhibits incredible naiveté" in affairs such as when German scientists withdrew from a paper that seemed to them "uncomfortably close to pre-Nazi racial theories", or when Native American specimen donors wished to limit the use of their DNA. Hawks argues that science needs to help people to see the humanity of the dead ancestors, and finds Reich's approach potentially dehumanizing.

The scholar of humanities Barry Wood writes that the book is "densely-packed", not sparing on explanations of advanced techniques, but allowing the determined reader to grasp the methods of genomic analysis. He comments that the "tradeoff" for this detail is "a certain lack of continuity". He notes that Reich argues that migration is what his analysis illuminates best, but comments that Reich's discrete studies of human migrations do not yet add up to "a sequential narrative of the peopling of the earth".

The archaeologist Daniela Hofmann describes the book as clear and accessible, but calls Reich "not shy of controversy"; she states that the book is "very much an advertisement for Reich's research agenda" and "unashamedly partial".

=== "How Not To Talk About Race And Genetics" ===
An open letter titled "How Not To Talk About Race And Genetics" by a group of 67 scientists and scholars criticizes Reich's use of the term "race" in this book. The group welcomes Reich's challenge to the "misrepresentations about race and genetics" made by the science writer Nicholas Wade and the molecular biologist James Watson, but warns that his skill with genomics "should not be confused with a mastery of the cultural, political, and biological meanings of human groups."

According to computational biologist Hussein Mohsen, Reich's examples "conflated ancestry with race, relied on the quantitative reductionism of averages, and failed to address the everyday ramifications of pathologizing socially constructed (racial or ancestral) categories to which millions of human beings belong or were historically forced to." In contrast to Reich's analysis, Mohsen cites the open letter as an accurate representation of "the complexity of the race concept and stark limitations of quantitative genetics to grasp its fluid histories."

The economist Tyler Cowen calls the book "truly excellent, readable and informative". Cowen insists it is "a science book, not a 'race book'", stating that although it has engendered "some public controversy", he is confident that no attentive reader could feel "affirmed in racist beliefs".

Peter Forbes, in The Guardian, calls the book "thrilling in its clarity and its scope." In Forbes's view, Reich handles racist abuses of human origin stories, such as Nazi ideology, "commendably". Forbes writes that Reich explains how ancient DNA teaches a single general lesson, that the human population of any particular place has repeatedly changed since the last ice age. Any supposed "mystical, longstanding" link between some people and a place based on some kind of racial purity (as reflected in the Nazi slogan of "blood and soil"), is in Reich's words "flying in the face of hard science".

Clive Cookson, in the Financial Times, notes that Reich dismisses worries that DNA evidence of differences between populations is "racism in genetic clothing", and that on the contrary, the "unsuspected degree of mixing" in every part of human history makes old ideas of racial purity "absurd".

The archaeologist and geneticist Turi King, in Nature, notes that Reich reflects on the dangers of misinterpretation by racists, who "pick and choose results", or others who opt to "sweep [genetic] differences under the carpet". But, King argues, echoing Reich, we do need "a non-loaded way to talk about genetic diversity and similarities in populations", and Reich has begun to do that.

== Sources ==
- Reich, David (2018). Who We Are and How We Got Here. Oxford University Press. ISBN 978-0-19-882125-0.
