= David Reich (geneticist) =

American geneticist (born 1974)

- Born: David Emil Reich; July 14, 1974 (age 52); Washington, D.C., U.S.
- Education: Harvard University (BA); St Catherine's College, Oxford (DPhil)
- Awards: Nature's 10 (2015); Dan David Prize (2017); NAS Award in Molecular Biology (2019); Wiley Prize (2019); Darwin–Wallace Medal (2019); Massry Prize (2021); Antiquity Prize (2022)
- Scientific career
- Fields: Gene mapping
- Thesis: Genetic analysis of human evolutionary history with implications for gene mapping (1999)
- Doctoral advisor: David Goldstein

David Emil Reich (born July 14, 1974) is an American geneticist known for his work on the phylogenetics and migration history of humans through statistical analysis of contemporary populations and ancient DNA, and is considered a founding figure in the fields of population genomics and paleogenetics. In particular, he has focused on the genetic history of Europe, and on archaic admixture between modern humans, neanderthals, and denisovans. He is a professor in the Department of Genetics at Harvard Medical School, an associate of the Broad Institute, and an investigator at the Howard Hughes Medical Institute. Reich was highlighted as one of Nature's 10 for his contributions to science in 2015. He received the Dan David Prize in 2017, the NAS Award in Molecular Biology, the Wiley Prize, and the Darwin–Wallace Medal in 2019, and the Massry Prize in 2021.

== Early life and education ==
Reich grew up as part of a Jewish family in Washington, D.C. His parents are novelist Tova Reich (sister of Rabbi Avi Weiss) and Walter Reich, a professor at George Washington University, who served as the first director of the United States Holocaust Memorial Museum. During high school, Reich attended the Research Science Institute at MIT. Reich started out as a sociology major as an undergraduate at Harvard College, but later turned his attention to physics and medicine and earned a B.A. in the subject. After graduation, he attended the University of Oxford, originally with the intent of preparing for medical school. He was awarded a D.Phil. in zoology from St Catherine's College, Oxford, in 1999 for research supervised by David Goldstein. His thesis was titled "Genetic analysis of human evolutionary history with implications for gene mapping".

== Academic career ==
He joined Harvard Medical School in 2003. In 2013, his lab finished construction on the first facility dedicated to the sequencing and analysis of ancient human genetics. His research includes a focus on medical genetics, population admixture among modern humans and its archaic sister species, and the demographic history of Europe and Eurasia. In 2026, Reich and colleagues published a paper which in part included evidence from over 10,000 newly sequenced ancient genomes, increasing the amount of ancient genomes available for peer research and collaboration by orders of magnitude. This database included robust evidence of strong trends in natural selection among modern humans in the last 10,000 years, a position previously hotly debated. His lab is responsible for developing a range of statistical methods used in analyzing demographic history from genome sequencing, in particular those used to identify ancient admixture in modern populations.

== Genetic research ==
=== Split of chimpanzees and humans (2006) ===
Reich's research team at Harvard University has produced evidence that, over a span of at least four million years, various parts of the human genome diverged gradually from those of chimpanzees. The split between the human and chimpanzee lineages may have occurred millions of years later than fossilized bones suggest, and the break may not have been as clean as previously thought. The genetic evidence developed by Reich's team suggests that after the two species initially separated, they may have continued interbreeding for several million years. A final genetic split transpired between 6.3 million and 5.4 million years ago.

=== Indian population (2009) ===
Reich's 2009 paper Reconstructing Indian population history was a landmark study in the research on India's genepool and the origins of its population. Reich et al. (2009), in a collaborative effort between the Harvard Medical School and the Indian Centre for Cellular and Molecular Biology (CCMB), examined the entire genomes worth 560,000 single-nucleotide polymorphisms (SNPs), as compared to 420 SNPs in prior work. They also cross-compared them with the genomes of other regions available in the global genome database. Through this study, they were able to discern two genetic groups in the majority of populations in India, which they called "Ancestral North Indians" (ANI) and "Ancestral South Indians" (ASI). (Note: Reich (2009) excluded the Austro-Asiatic and Tibeto-Burman speakers from their analysis in order to avoid interference.) They found that the ANI genes are close to those of Middle Easterners, Central Asians and Europeans whereas the ASI genes are dissimilar to all other known populations outside India. (Note: Reich (2009): "We analyze 25 diverse groups to provide strong evidence for two ancient populations, genetically divergent, that are ancestral to most Indians today. One, the "Ancestral North Indians" (ANI), is genetically close to Middle Easterners, Central Asians, and Europeans, while the other, the "Ancestral South Indians" (ASI), is as distinct from ANI and East Asians as they are from each other.") (Note: Moorjani et al. (2013): "Most Indian groups descend from a mixture of two genetically divergent populations: Ancestral North Indians (ANI) related to Central Asians, Middle Easterners, Caucasians, and Europeans; and Ancestral South Indians (ASI) not closely related to groups outside the subcontinent.") These two distinct groups, which had split ca. 50,000 years ago, formed the basis for the present population of India.

A follow-up study by Moorjani et al. (2013) revealed that the two groups mixed between 1,900 and 4,200 years ago (2200 BCE–100 CE), after which a shift to endogamy took place and admixture became rare. (Note: Moorjani et al. (2013): "We report genome-wide data from 73 groups from the Indian subcontinent and analyze linkage disequilibrium to estimate ANI-ASI mixture dates ranging from about 1,900 to 4,200 years ago. In a subset of groups, 100% of the mixture is consistent with having occurred during this period. These results show that India experienced a demographic transformation several thousand years ago, from a region in which major population mixture was common to one in which mixture even between closely related groups became rare because of a shift to endogamy.") Speaking to Fountain Ink, David Reich stated, "Prior to 4,200 years ago, there were unmixed groups in India. Sometime between 1,900 to 4,200 years ago, profound, pervasive convulsive mixture occurred, affecting every Indo-European and Dravidian group in India without exception." Reich pointed out in 2014 that their work does not show that a substantial migration occurred during this time.

Metspalu et al. (2011), representing a collaboration between the Estonian Biocenter and CCMB, confirmed that the Indian populations are characterized by two major ancestry components. One of them is spread at comparable frequency and haplotype diversity in populations of South and West Asia and the Caucasus. The second component is more restricted to South Asia and accounts for more than 50% of the ancestry in Indian populations. Haplotype diversity associated with these South Asian ancestry components is significantly higher than that of the components dominating the West Eurasian ancestry palette.

=== Human genetic map (2011) ===
Reich was a co-leader, along with statistician Simon Myers, of a team of genetics researchers from Harvard University and the University of Oxford that made the most complete human genetic map then known in July 2011.

=== Interbreeding of Neanderthals and humans (2010–2012) ===
Reich's research team significantly contributed to the discovery that Neanderthals and Denisovans interbred with modern human populations as they dispersed from Africa into Eurasia 70,000–30,000 years ago.

=== Genetic markers for prostate cancer ===
Reich's lab received media attention following its discovery of a genetic marker which is linked to an increased likelihood of developing prostate cancer. Reich has also argued that the higher incidence of prostate cancer among African Americans, compared to European Americans, appears to be largely genetic in origin.

=== Indo-European origins ===
Reich disputed the idea that Indo-European languages originated in Anatolia due to a lack of genetic similarity of Anatolian samples with the steppe Yamnaya culture, instead suggesting the languages may have originated south of the Caucasus, in present-day Iran or Armenia and split into two branches with one going to the steppe and one to Anatolia which is close to the Armenian hypothesis.

=== Eurasian back-migrations ===
Reich in 2018 demonstrated, based on genetic evidence, that West Asian geneflow into modern populations in Ethiopia and Somalia, particularly speakers of Afroasiatic languages, could support a diffusion of these languages from the Middle East.

=== Software tools ===
Reich has developed ADMIXTOOLS 2, an R software package primarily used for analyzing admixture, in collaboration with Nick Patterson.

== Books ==
- Reich, David (2018). Who We Are and How We Got Here. Oxford University Press. ISBN 978-019-882-1250.

== Sources ==
- Metspalu, Mait; Romero, Irene Gallego; Yunusbayev, Bayazit; Chaubey, Gyaneshwer; Mallick, Chandana Basu; Hudjashov, Georgi; Nelis, Mari; Mägi, Reedik; Metspalu, Ene; Remm, Maido; Pitchappan, Ramasamy; Singh, Lalji; Thangaraj, Kumarasamy; Villems, Richard; Kivisild, Toomas (2011), "Shared and Unique Components of Human Population Structure and Genome-Wide Signals of Positive Selection in South Asia", The American Journal of Human Genetics, 89 (6): 731–744, doi:10.1016/j.ajhg.2011.11.010, ISSN 0002-9297, PMC 3234374, PMID 22152676
- Moorjani, P.; Thangaraj, K.; Patterson, N.; Lipson, M.; Loh, P. R.; Govindaraj, P.; Singh, L. (2013), "Genetic evidence for recent population mixture in India", The American Journal of Human Genetics, 93 (3): 422–438, doi:10.1016/j.ajhg.2013.07.006, PMC 3769933, PMID 23932107
- Reich, David; Thangaraj, Kumarasamy; Patterson, Nick; Price, Alkes L.; Singh, Lalji (2009), "Reconstructing Indian population history", Nature, 461 (7263): 489–494, Bibcode:2009Natur.461..489R, doi:10.1038/nature08365, ISSN 0028-0836, PMC 2842210, PMID 19779445
- Lidz, Franz (2021-12-22). "3,000 Years Ago, Britain Got Half Its Genes From … France?". The New York Times. ISSN 0362-4331.
- Patterson, Nick; Isakov, Michael; Booth, Thomas; Büster, Lindsey; Fischer, Claire-Elise; et al. (2022-01-27). "Large-scale migration into Britain during the Middle to Late Bronze Age". Nature. 601 (7894): 588–594. Bibcode:2022Natur.601..588P. doi:10.1038/s41586-021-04287-4. ISSN 1476-4687. PMC 8889665. PMID 34937049.
