= Tova Reich =

American writer

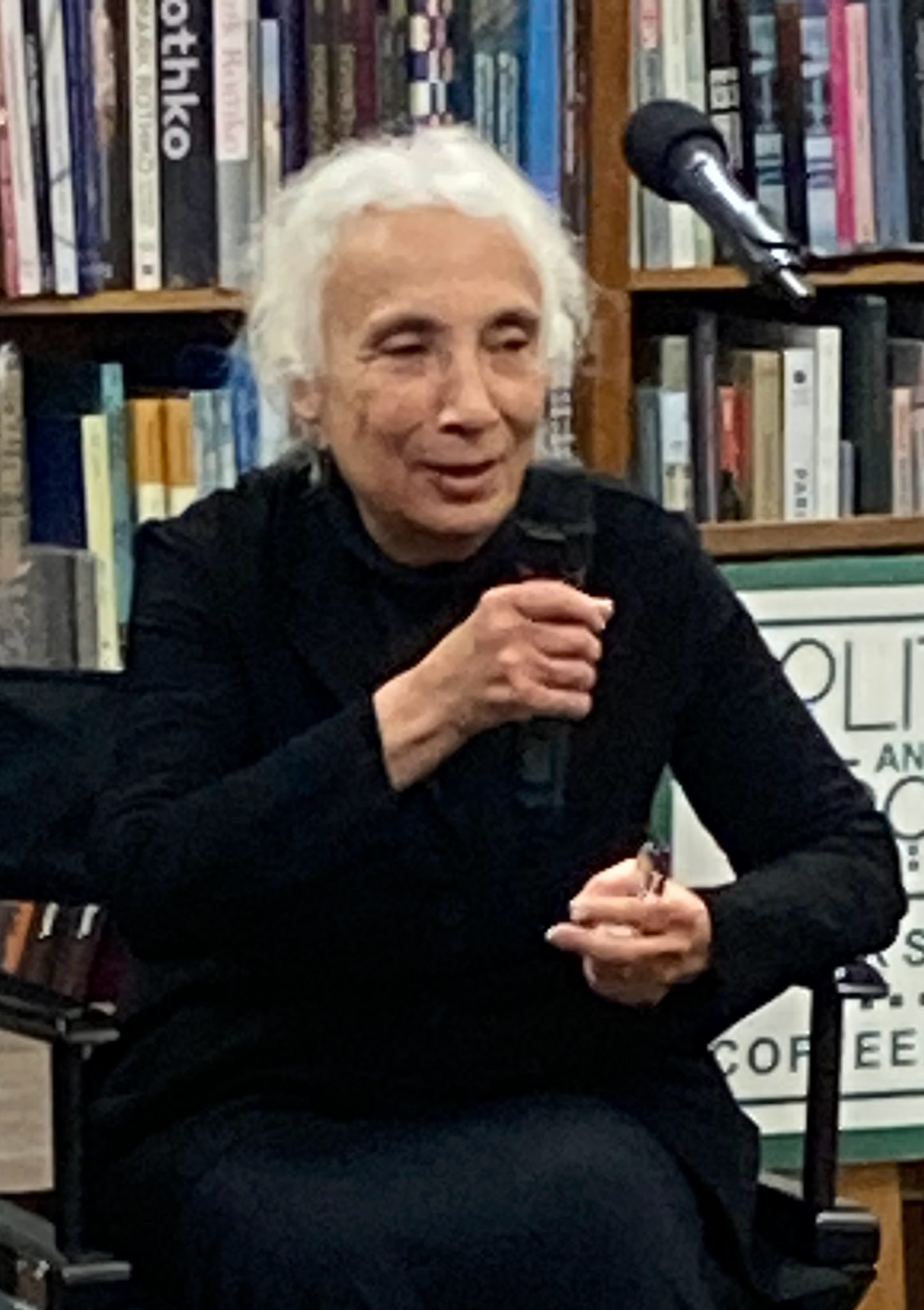
Image of Tova Reich

Tova Rachel Reich (née Weiss; born December 24, 1942, in Liberty, New York) is an American writer whose works in Master of the Return (1988), My Holocaust (2007), Mother India (2018), The House of Love and Prayer (2023), and Camp Jeff (2024). Her sophomore novel won the 1988 Edward Lewis Wallant Award. Her work has also appeared in Tablet.

Reich taught English at Southern Connecticut State College (1972–73) and American University (1974–1977). She also taught at University of Maryland.

Tova Weiss was born to Moshe and Miriam Weiss, and is the sister of Rabbi Avi Weiss. She received Bachelor of Arts from Brooklyn College (1964) and a Master of Arts from New York University (1965). On June 10, 1965, she married American magazine editor, psychiatrist, and writer Walter Reich, with whom she eventually had three children: Daniel Salo, David Emile, and Rebecca Zohar.

== Works ==
- Reich, Tova (1978). Mara. New York: Farrar, Straus, Giroux. ISBN 978-0-374-20286-6.
- Reich, Tova (1988). Master of the Return. Houghton Mifflin Harcourt P. ISBN 978-0-15-157880-1.
- Reich, Tova (1995). The Jewish War. New York: Pantheon Books. ISBN 978-0-679-43987-5.
- Reich, Tova (April 3, 2007). My Holocaust. New York, NY: Harper Collins. ISBN 978-0-06-117345-5.
- Reich, Tova (March 5, 2013). One Hundred Philistine Foreskins. Counterpoint. ISBN 978-1619021075.
- Reich, Tova (November 13, 2018). Mother India. Syracuse, New York: Syracuse University Press. ISBN 978-0-8156-1106-6.
- Reich, Tova (April 25, 2023). The House of Love and Prayer. Seven Stories Press. ISBN 978-1-64421-274-5.
- Reich, Tova (October 29, 2024). Camp Jeff. Seven Stories Press. ISBN 978-1-64421-421-3.
