= MtDNA haplogroups in populations of South Asia =

Listed here are notable groups and populations from South Asia by human mitochondrial DNA haplogroups based on relevant studies. The samples are taken from individuals identified with linguistic designations (IE=Indo-European, Dr=Dravidian, AA=Austro-Asiatic and ST=Sino-Tibetan); the third column gives the sample size studied, and the other columns give the percentage of the particular haplogroup. The two most widespread MtDNA haplogroups in South Asia are Haplogroup M (of South Asian origin) and Haplogroup U (of West Eurasian origin).

Note: The converted frequencies from some old studies conducted in the first decade of the 21st century may lead to unsubstantial frequencies below.

| Population | Sample Size | Language | HVS-I haplotype diversity | A | L1–L3 | M | M2 | M3 | M5 | MΔ9bp | U | H, V, T, J, N, X, K, W | B, F, D, G | R | P | Reference |
|---|---|---|---|---|---|---|---|---|---|---|---|---|---|---|---|---|
| Bengali in Bangladesh | 86 | IE | | 1.2 | | 67.4 | | | | | 12.8 | 5.8 | 3.5 | 9.3 | | Rishishwar2017 |
| Chenchu (South Indian tribal) | 96 | Dr | 0.87 | | 0 | 97 | 18 | 1 | 19 | 3 | 0 | 0 | 0 | 1 | | Kivisild2003 |
| Gujarati Indian in Houston, Texas | 106 | IE | | | 2.8 | 38.7 | | | | | 15.1 | 13.2 | | 30.2 | | Rishishwar2017 |
| Gujaratis and Konkanastha Br. | 111 | IE | 0.99 | | 0 | 48 | 5 | 6 | 0 | 0 | 23 | 10 | 5 | 11 | | Kivisild2003 |
| Indian Telugu in the UK | 103 | Dr | | | | 59.2 | | | | | 13.6 | 14.6 | | 12.6 | | Rishishwar2017 |
| Kerala/Karnataka | 99 | Dr | 0.96 | | 0 | 64 | 15 | 6 | 15 | 0 | 21 | | 0 | 9 | | Kivisild2003 |
| Koyas | 81 | Dr | 0.94 | | 0 | 69 | 19 | 6 | 0 | 21 | 1 | 0 | 0 | 31 | | Kivisild2003 |
| Lambadis | 86 | IE | 0.99 | | 0 | 64 | 10 | 5 | 10 | 0 | 12 | 8 | 0 | 13 | | Kivisild2003 |
| Lobanas (Punjab) | 62 | IE | 0.98 | | 0 | 55 | 5 | 5 | 8 | 0 | 5 | 8 | 0 | 18 | | Kivisild2003 |
| Punjabi in Lahore, Pakistan | 96 | IE | | | | 57.3 | | | | | 11.5 | 14.6 | 5.2 | 11.5 | | Rishishwar2017 |
| Punjabis | 112 | IE | 0.99 | | 0 | 41 | 1 | 4 | 1 | 0 | 20 | 19 | 5 | 10 | | Kivisild2003 |
| Sri Lanka | 132 | Dr, IE | 0.99 | | 0 | 58 | 7 | 5 | 2 | 0 | 18 | 8 | 2 | 14 | | Kivisild2003 |
| Sinhalese | 100 | IE | | | | 42 | | | | | 21 | 6 | 7 | 20 | 2 | Ranaweera2014 |
| Sinhalese | 60 | IE | | | | 51.7 | | | | | | | | | | Ranasinghe2015 |
| Vedda | 75 | IE | | | | 17.33 | | | | | 29.33 | | 8 | 45.33 | | Ranaweera2014 |
| Vedda | 30 | IE | | | | 36.6 | | | | | | | | | | Ranasinghe2015 |
| Sri Lankan Tamil in the UK | 103 | Dr | | 1.0 | | 48.5 | | | | | 13.6 | 15.5 | | 21.4 | | Rishishwar2017 |
| Sri Lankan Tamil | 39 | Dr | | | | 43.59 | | | | | 15.38 | 20.51 | 7.69 | 7.69 | 5.13 | Ranaweera2014 |
| Sri Lankan Tamil | 30 | Dr | | | | 53.5 | | | | | | | | | | Ranasinghe2015 |
| Indian Tamil in Sri Lanka | 57 | Dr | | | | 70.8 | | | | | 12.28 | 1.75 | 5.26 | 8.77 | 1.75 | Ranaweera2014 |
| Indian Tamil in Sri Lanka | 22 | Dr | | | | 81.8 | | | | | | | | | | Ranasinghe2015 |
| Tamil Nadu tribal | 49 | Dr | 0.96 | | 0 | 71 | 2 | 24 | 0 | 0 | 16 | 0 | 0 | 12 | | Kivisild2003 |
| Telugu, lower | 70 | Dr | 0.99 | | 0 | 71 | 10 | 1 | 4 | 0 | 7 | 1 | 0 | 21 | | Kivisild2003 |
| Telugu, middle | 114 | Dr | 0.99 | | 0 | 64 | 6 | 4 | 4 | 0 | 10 | 5 | 0 | 21 | | Kivisild2003 |
| Telugu, upper | 59 | Dr | 0.99 | | 0 | 61 | 5 | 19 | 0 | 0 | 19 | 3 | 0 | 15 | | Kivisild2003 |
| Uttar Pradesh | 139 | IE | 0.99 | | 0 | 57 | 3 | 10 | 0 | 0 | 17 | 6 | 1 | 14 | | Kivisild2003 |
| Western Bengal tribal | 34 | IE | 0.99 | | 0 | 65 | 6 | 9 | 0 | 0 | 21 | 0 | 0 | 15 | | Kivisild2003 |
| Western Bengalis | 106 | IE | 0.97 | | 0 | 72 | 4 | 7 | 6 | 0 | 10 | 6 | 0 | 11 | | Kivisild2003 |

U* = other derivatives of haplogroup U; R* = derivatives of haplogroup R that do not belong to HV, TJ, U, B, and F.
