= Nick Patterson (scientist) =

American computational geneticist (born 1947)

- Born: Nicholas James Patterson; June 9, 1947 (age 78); Bayswater, England
- Education: University of Cambridge
- Known for: Neanderthal genome project
- Scientific career
- Fields: Genetics
- Institutions: Broad Institute
- Thesis: On Conway's Group .O and Some Other Groups (1973)
- Doctoral advisor: John G. Thompson

Nicholas James Patterson (born 9 June 1947) is a mathematician working as a staff scientist at the Broad Institute with notable contributions to the area of computational genomics. His work has appeared in scientific journals such as Nature, Science and Nature Genetics. His research has brought a better understanding of early human migrations. He is among the group of scientists who have sequenced the Neanderthal genome in 2010. This was followed by the sequencing of a much higher quality Neanderthal genome, where the subject was from the Altai Mountains, in 2014. These studies have uncovered some unexpected facts about the interbreeding between archaic and modern humans.

== Biography ==
Patterson was an only child who grew up in the Bayswater section of central London. Patterson received his B.A. and Ph.D. in mathematics at Cambridge University. His doctoral advisor was John G. Thompson. He initially worked for the British code-breaking agency GCHQ and the Center for Communications Research in Princeton.

Following this cryptology work, Patterson worked at the quantitative trading firm Renaissance Technologies.

In 2001, Patterson joined the Center for Genome Research at MIT, the Whitehead Institute. He briefly worked on gene expression data applied to cancer before switching to the study of human genetics.

In 2012, Patterson developed ADMIXTOOLS, a software package written in C that is currently widely used by population geneticists.

=== Chess ===
Nick Patterson was a child chess prodigy. He won the Irish Chess Championship in 1969. In a long game in the Chess Olympiad of Siegen in 1970, where he played top board for Ireland, he met the Danish grandmaster Bent Larsen, who was one of the top 10 players in the world at the time, and managed to make a draw as black after 93 moves.
