= My Holocaust =

2007 novel by Tova Reich

- First edition
- Author: Tova Reich
- Language: English
- Genre: Satirical novel
- Publisher: HarperCollins
- Publication date: April 3, 2007
- Publication place: United States
- Media type: Print
- Pages: 336 pp
- ISBN: 0-06-117345-2
- OCLC: 77256303
- LC Class: PS3568.E4763 M9 2007

My Holocaust is a 2007 novel by American writer Tova Reich. The novel is a satire on the commercialization of Holocaust remembrance.
