= Parahaplogroup =

A parahaplogroup is a term used in genetics to identify a paraphyletic haplogroup.

They are normally described with the name of their parent haplogroup plus an asterisk (for instance: F*, U2*), meaning that it includes all derivates from the parent haplogroup (F or U2 in the examples) except those mentioned elsewhere.

Sometimes it is specified which other subclades are excluded and then the parent name is followed by the sign "x" and the list of those excluded haplogroups, separated by commas. This is often stated between brackets. For example: NxR means all derivates from haplogroup N except haplogroup R, or K(xP,NO) means all derivates from haplogroup K except those belonging to P and NO.
