= Indigenous Australians =

Aboriginal Australians and Torres Strait Islander peoples

Aboriginal Australians and Torres Strait Islanders Indigenous Australians
Total population
- 983,700 (2021 census) (Note: 3.8% of Australia's population)

Languages
- mostly English (Australian English, Australian Aboriginal English, small minority Torres Strait English) minority: Australian Aboriginal languages Torres Strait Creole; Australian Kriol

Religion
- Christianity 54%; secular, other spiritual, no religion 36%; Australian Aboriginal religion <2%

Related ethnic groups
- Papuans, Melanesians

Indigenous Australians are the various Aboriginal Australian peoples of Australia, and the ethnically distinct people of the Torres Strait Islands. The terms Aboriginal and Torres Strait Islander peoples, First Nations of Australia, First Peoples of Australia, and First Australians are also common. Many indigenous Australians prefer to identify with their specific cultural group. (Note: The use of the term indigenous or indigenous Australian is discouraged by many for being too generic or dehumanising. Aboriginal and Torres Strait Islanders generally prefer more specific terms for their unique cultural origins or "Aboriginal and Torres Strait Islander".)

Estimates from the 2021 Australian census show that there were almost one million indigenous Australians, representing 3.8% of the Australian population. About 92% of indigenous Australians identified as Aboriginal, 4% identified as Torres Strait Islander and 4% identified with both groups. About 84% spoke English at home and 9% spoke an Aboriginal or Torres Strait language at home. Just over half hold secular or other spiritual beliefs or no religious affiliation; about 40% are Christian; and about 1% adhere to a traditional Aboriginal religion.

The ancestors of Aboriginal Australians moved into the Australian continent about 50,000 to 65,000 years ago, during the last glacial period, arriving by land bridges and short sea crossings from Southeast Asia. The ancestors of the Torres Strait Islanders arrived from Papua New Guinea around 2,500 years ago and settled the islands on the northern tip of the Australian landmass.

Aboriginal Australians were complex hunter-gatherers with diverse economies and societies. There were about 600 tribes or nations and 250 languages with various dialects. Certain groups engaged in fire-stick farming and fish farming and built semi-permanent shelters. The extent to which some groups engaged in agriculture is controversial. Torres Strait Islanders were seafarers and obtained their livelihood from seasonal horticulture and the resources of their reefs and seas. They also developed agriculture on some of their islands. Villages had appeared in their areas by the 14th century.

The indigenous population prior to British settlement in 1788 has been estimated from 318,000 to more than 3,000,000. A population collapse, principally from new infectious diseases, followed British colonisation in 1788. Massacres, frontier armed conflicts and competition over resources with British settlers also contributed to the decline of the Aboriginal population.

From the 1930s, the indigenous population began to recover and indigenous communities founded organisations to advocate for their rights. From the 1960s indigenous people won the right to vote in federal and state elections, and some won the return of parts of their traditional lands. In 1992 the High Court of Australia, in the Mabo Case, found that Indigenous native title rights existed in common law. By 2021 indigenous Australians had exclusive or shared title to about 54% of the Australian land mass. Since 1995 the Australian Aboriginal flag and the Torres Strait Islander flag have been official flags of Australia.

From the 19th to the mid-20th century, government policy removed many mixed heritage children from Aboriginal communities, with the intent to assimilate them to what had become the majority white culture. In 1997 the Australian Human Rights Commission found that the policy constituted genocide.

== Terminology ==
The Australian Aboriginal flag, designed by Harold Thomas. Together with the Torres Strait Islander flag below, it was proclaimed a flag of Australia in 1995

=== Variations ===
There are a number of contemporary appropriate terms to use when referring to Indigenous peoples of Australia. In contrast to when settlers referred to them by various terms, in the 21st century there is consensus that it is important to respect the "preferences of individuals, families, or communities, and allow them to define what they are most comfortable with" when referring to Aboriginal and Torres Strait Islander people.

The word aboriginal has been in the English language since at least the 16th century to mean "first or earliest known, indigenous". It comes from the Latin ab (from) and origo (origin, beginning). The term was used in Australia as early as 1789 to describe its Aboriginal peoples. It became capitalised and was used as the common term to refer to both Aboriginal and Torres Strait Islanders. Today, the latter peoples are not included in this term. The term "Aborigine" (as opposed to "Aboriginal") is often disfavoured, as it is regarded as having colonialist connotations.

While the term "Indigenous Australians" has grown in popularity since the 1980s, many Aboriginal and Torres Strait Islander peoples dislike it. They feel that it is too generic and removes their distinct clan and people identity. However, many people think that the term is useful and convenient, and can be used where appropriate. Since the early 2000s terms such as First Nations, First Peoples and First Australians have become more common as the emphasise the sovereignty of their people and the nations prior to colonisation.

Being as specific as possible, for example naming the language group (such as Arrernte), or demonym relating to geographic area (such as Nunga), is preferred as a way to affirm and maintain a sense of identity. An example of this is a speech given by Rosalie Kunoth-Monks is which she stated:

I am not an Aboriginal, or indeed Indigenous. I am an Arrernte, Alyawarra First Nations person, a sovereign person from this country (speaks in language).

— Rosalie Kunoth-Monks, via Q+A, 9 June 2014

==== Terms "Black" and "Blackfella" ====
British colonists from their early settlement used the term "Black" to refer to Aboriginal Australians and later Torres Strait Islanders. While the term originally related to skin colour and was often used pejoratively, today the term is used to indicate Aboriginal or Torres Strait Islander heritage or culture in general. It refers to any people of such heritage regardless of their skin pigmentation.

In the 1970s, with a rise in Aboriginal activism, leaders such as Gary Foley proudly embraced the term "Black". For example, writer Kevin Gilbert's book of that time was entitled Living Black. The book included interviews with several members of the Aboriginal community, including Robert Jabanungga, who reflected on contemporary Aboriginal culture. Living Black is also the name of an Australian TV news and current affairs program covering "issues affecting Aboriginal and Torres Strait Islander Australians". It is presented and produced by Karla Grant, an Arrernte woman.

Use of the term "Black" varies depending on context, and its use may be deemed inappropriate. Furthermore, the term sometimes causes confusion as it can refer to Indigenous Australians, other groups such as African Australians and Melanesian Australians (South Sea Islanders, Papua New Guinean Australians and Fijian Australians), or all Black people.

A significant number of Aboriginal and Torres Strait Islander people use the term "Blackfella" and its associated forms to refer to Aboriginal Australians.

==== "Blak" ====
The term blak is sometimes used as part of a wider social movement (seen in terms such as "Blaktivism" and "Blak History Month"). The term was coined in 1991 by photographer and multimedia artist Destiny Deacon, in an exhibition entitled Blak lik mi. For Deacon's 2004 exhibition at the Museum of Contemporary Art, blak was defined in a museum guide as: "a term used by some Aboriginal people to reclaim historical, representational, symbolical, stereotypical and romanticised notions of Black or Blackness. Often used as ammunition or inspiration." Deacon said that removing the c from black to "de-weaponise the term 'black cunt'" was "taking on the 'colonisers' language and flipping it on its head".

Contemporary Aboriginal arts in the 21st century are sometimes referred to as a "Blak" arts movement, expressed in names such as BlakDance, BlakLash Collective, and the title of Thelma Plum's song and album, Better in Blak. Melbourne has an annual Blak & Bright literary festival, Blak Dot Gallery, Blak Markets, and Blak Cabaret.

==== Aboriginal Australians ====
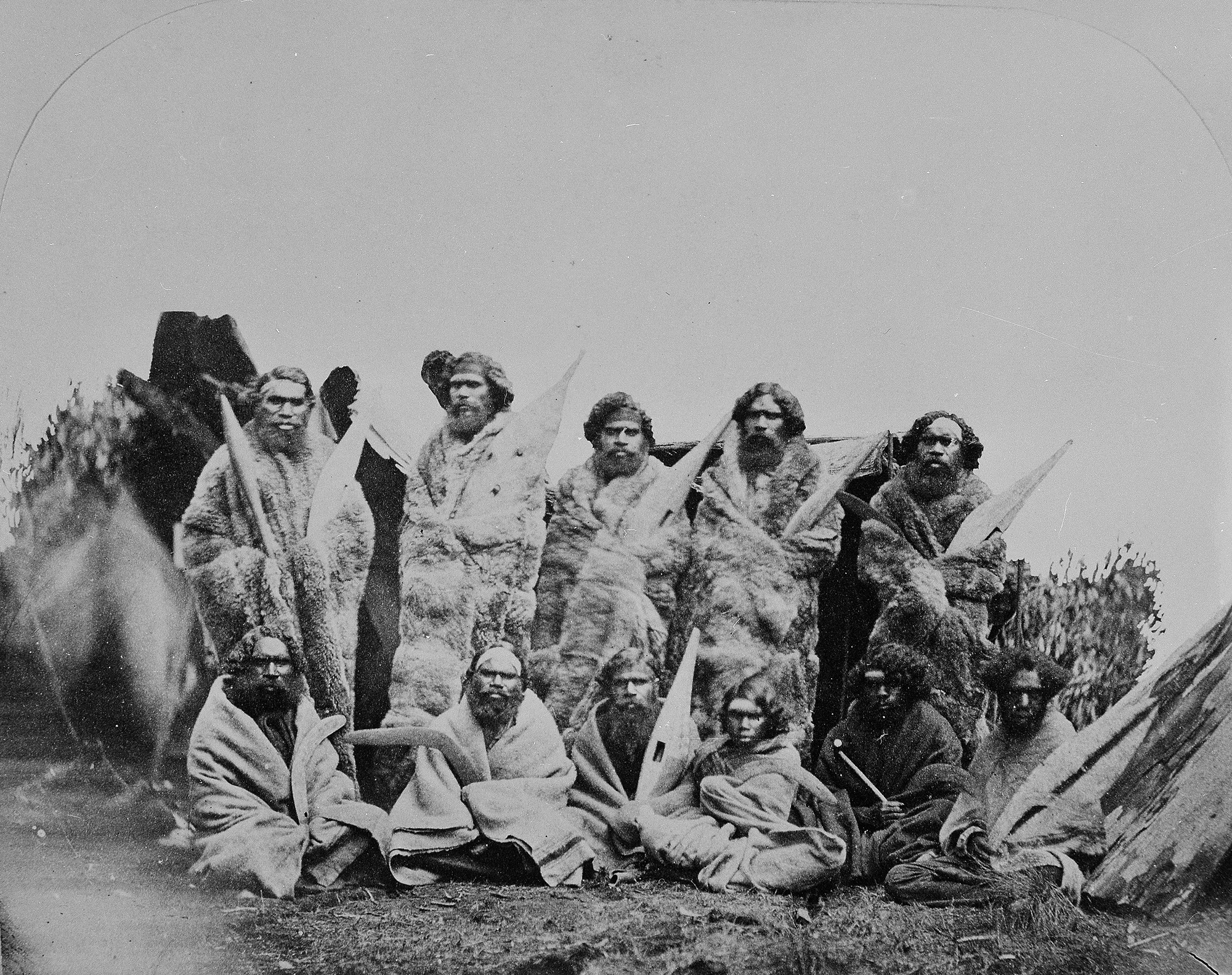
A group of Aboriginal men in possum-skin cloaks (c. 1858) in Victoria

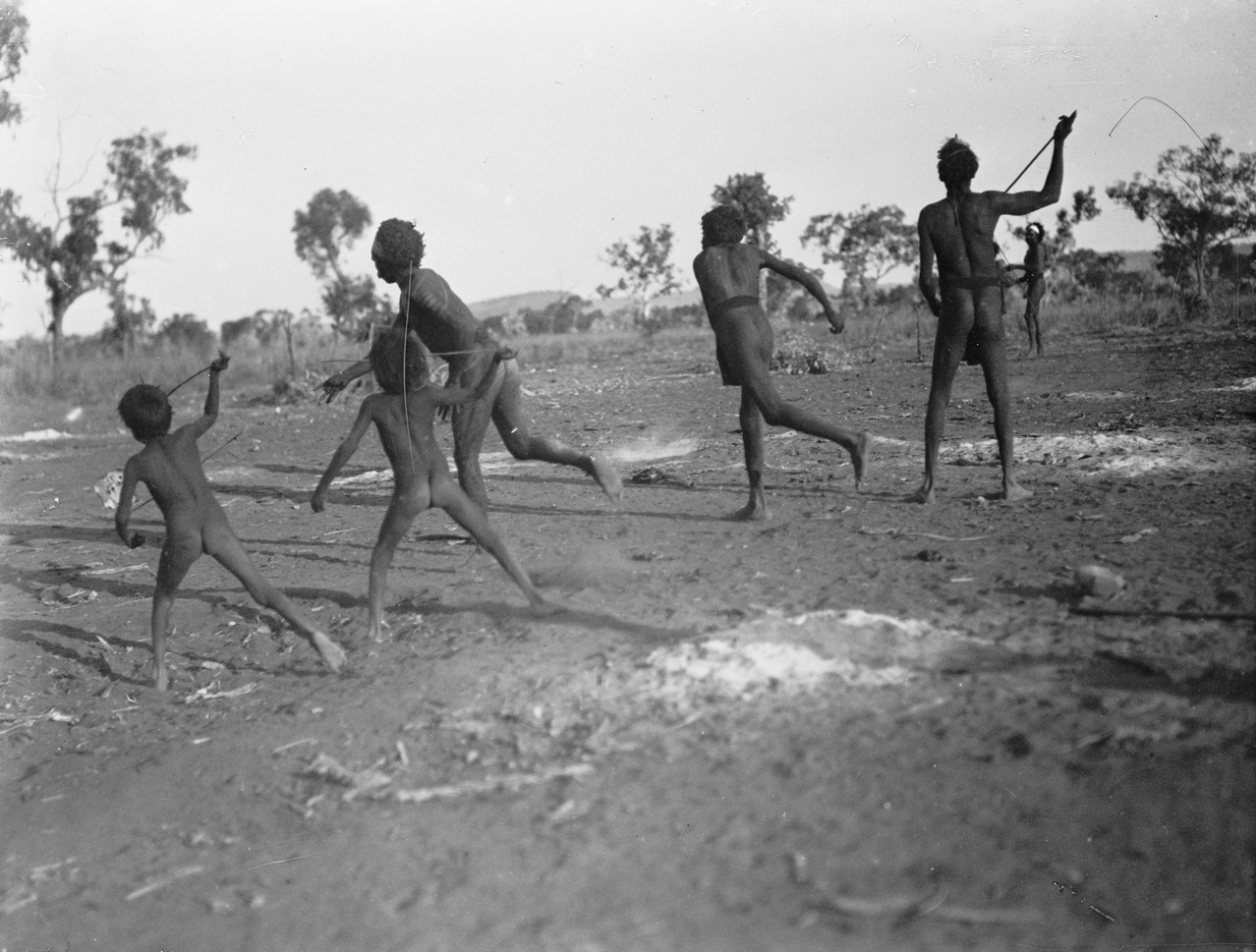
Men and boys playing a game of gorri, 1922

"Aboriginal Australians" refers to the various peoples indigenous to mainland Australia and associated islands, excluding the Torres Strait Islands.

The term Aboriginal Australians includes many regional groups that may be identified under names based on local language, locality, or what they are called by neighbouring groups. Groups can overlap, contain sub-groups. Groups can also evolve over time, and significant changes have occurred since colonisation. The word "community" is often used to describe groups identifying by kinship, language, or belonging to a particular place or "country". An individual community may identify itself by many names, each of which can have alternative English spellings.

Throughout the history of the continent, there have been many different Aboriginal groups, each with its own individual language, culture, and belief structure. At the time of British settlement, there were over 200 distinct languages.

==== Torres Strait Islanders ====
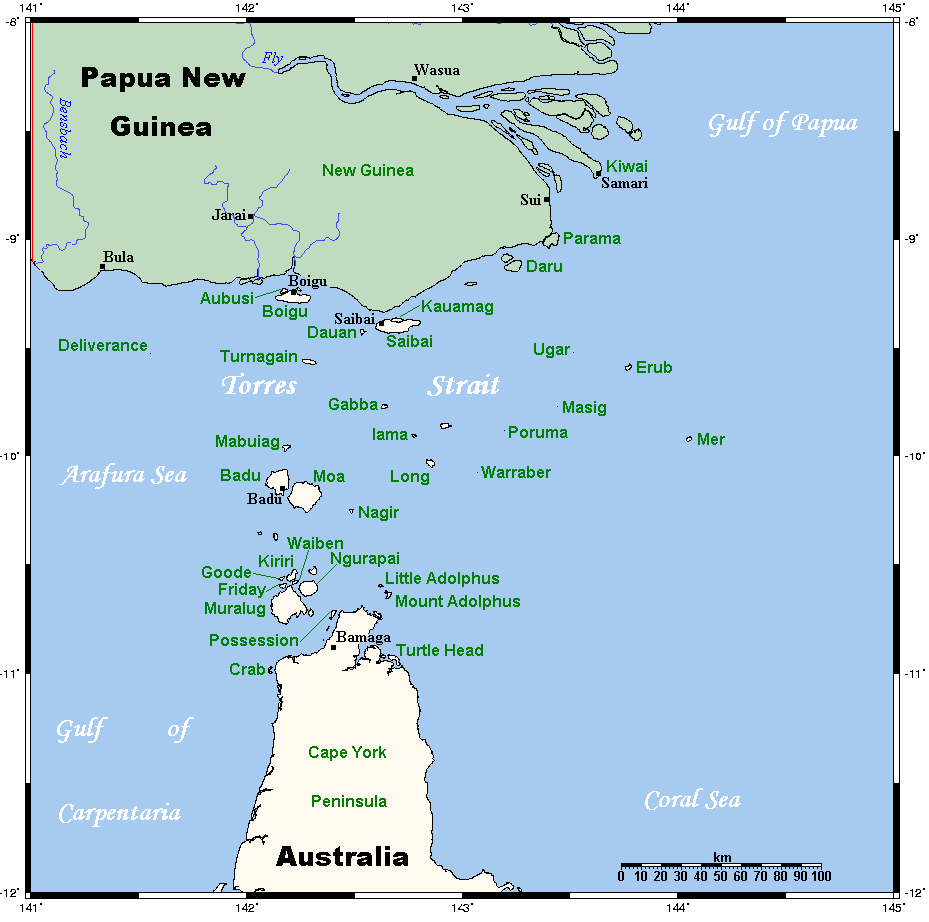
Torres Strait Islands

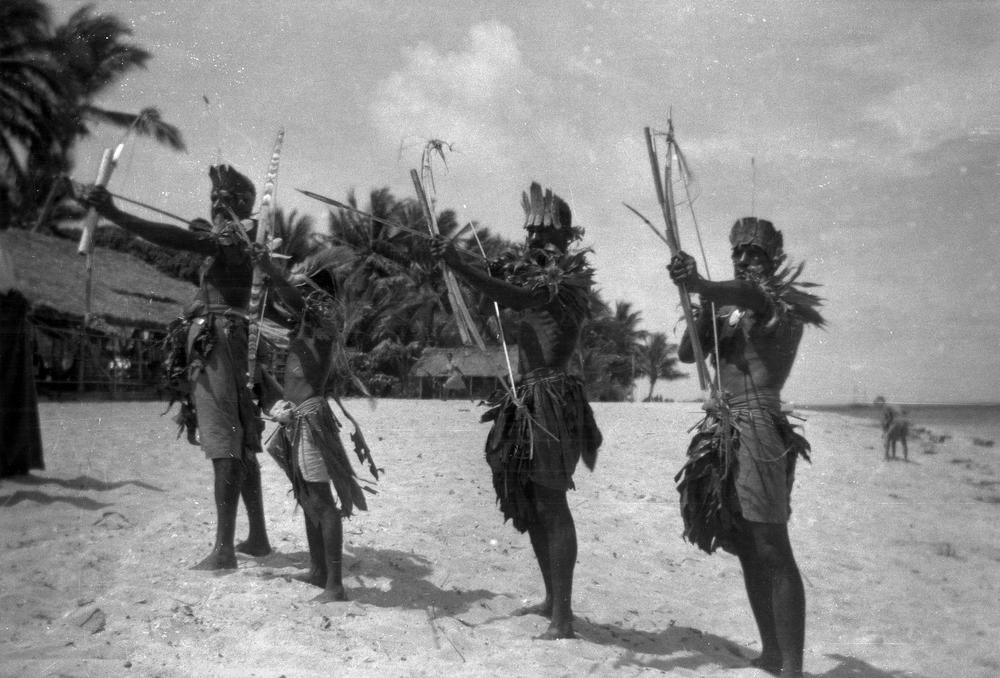
A 1960 photograph of native inhabitants of Murray Island.

Torres Strait Islanders are the Indigenous Melanesian people of the Torres Strait Islands, which are part of the state of Queensland. They are ethnically distinct from the Aboriginal peoples of the rest of Australia. Six percent of Indigenous Australians identify fully as Torres Strait Islanders. A further 4% of Indigenous Australians identify as having both Torres Strait Islander and Aboriginal heritage.

The Torres Strait Islands comprise over 100 islands, which were annexed by Queensland in 1879.

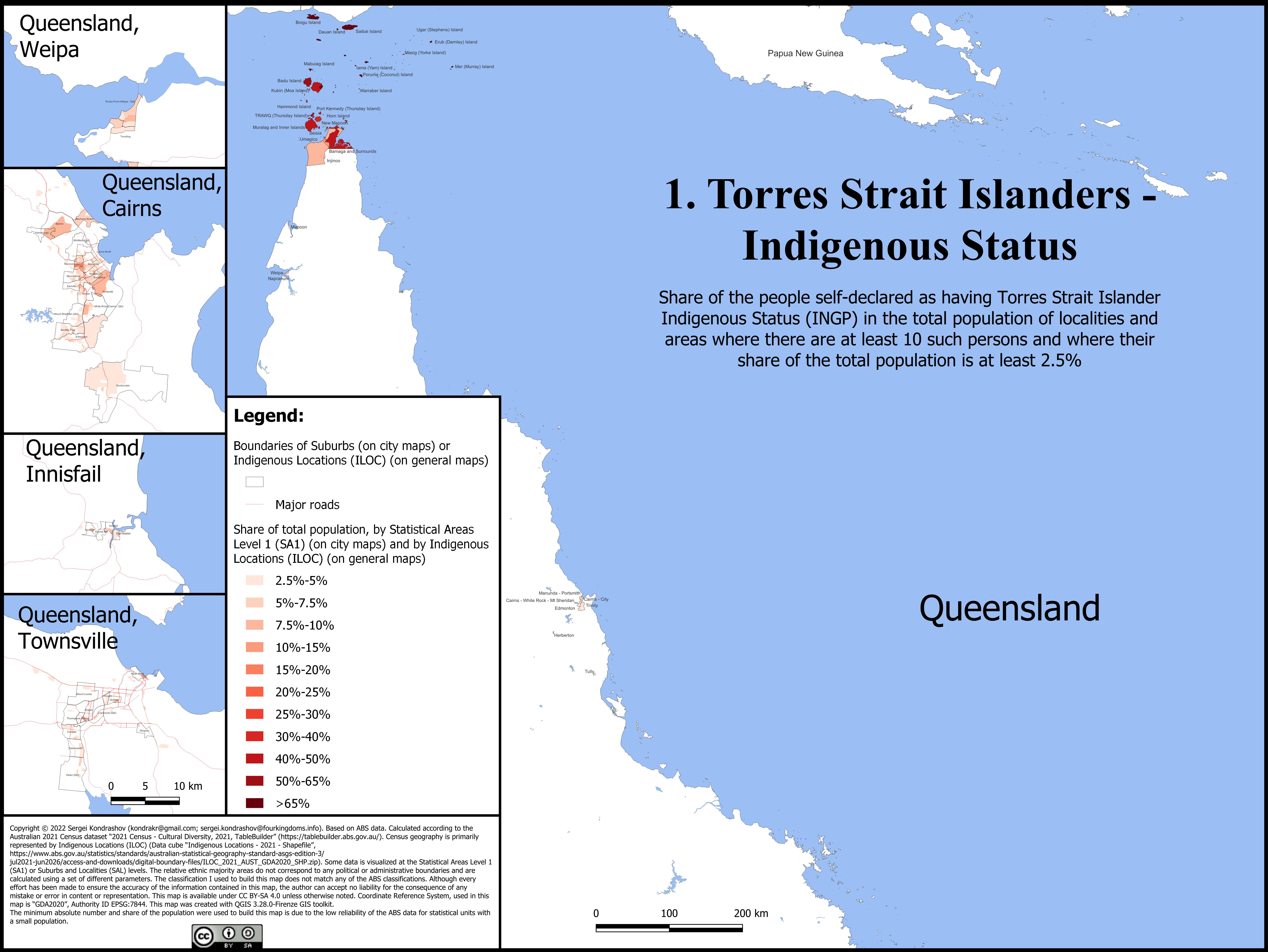
Geographical distribution of people with Torres Strait Islander Indigenous status

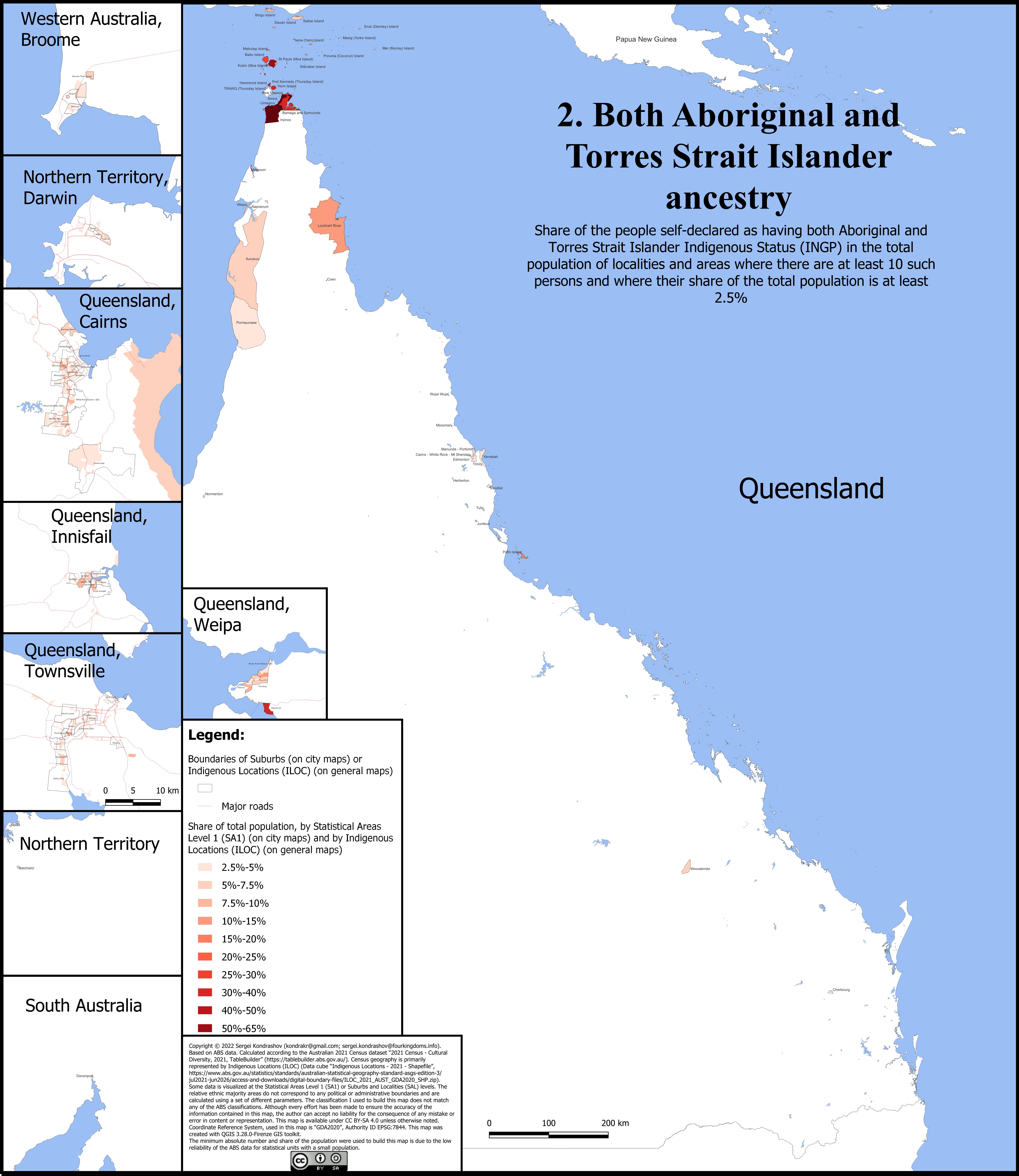
Geographical distribution of people with both Aboriginal and Torres Strait Islander Indigenous status

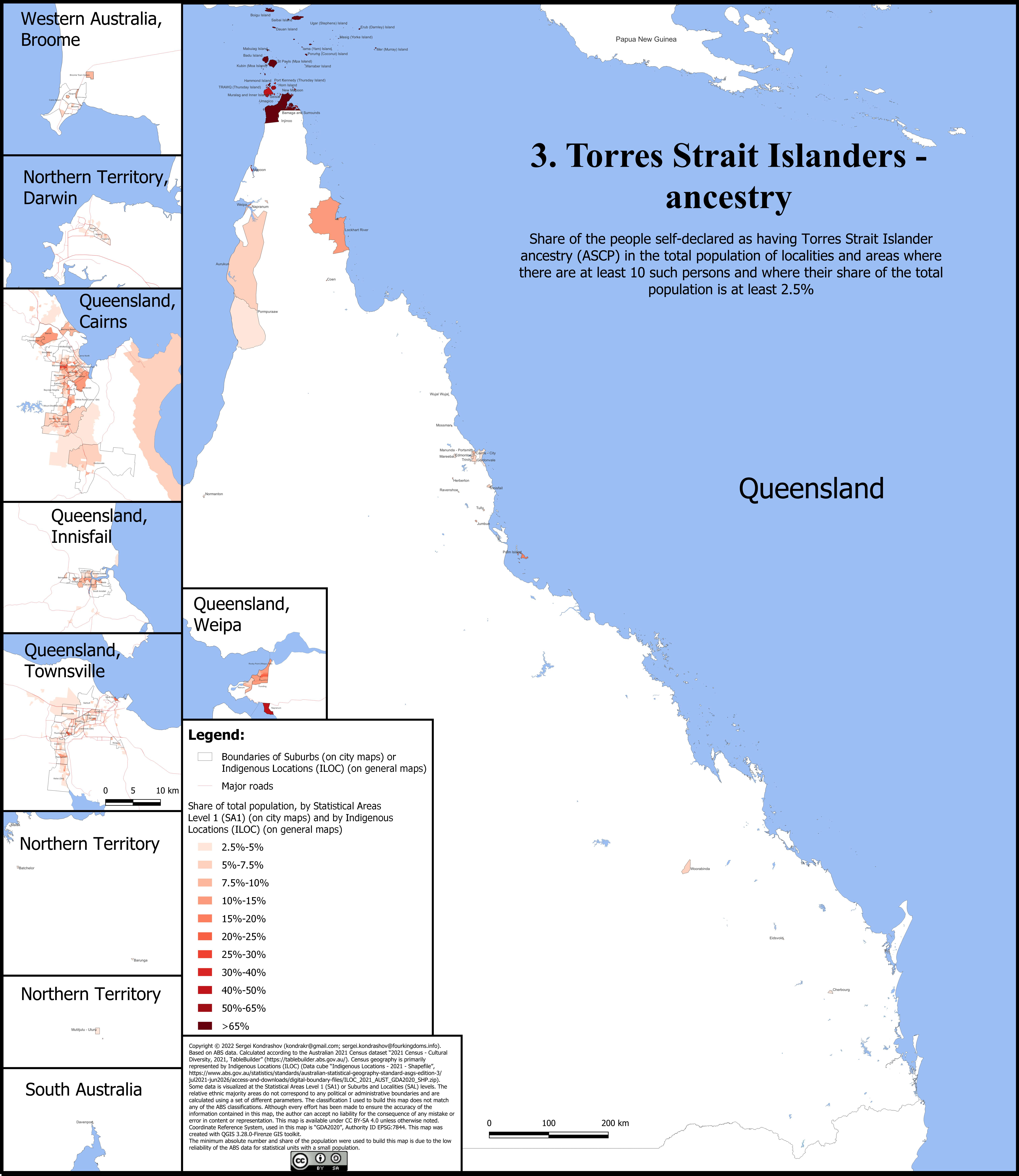
Geographical distribution of people with Torres Strait Islander ancestry

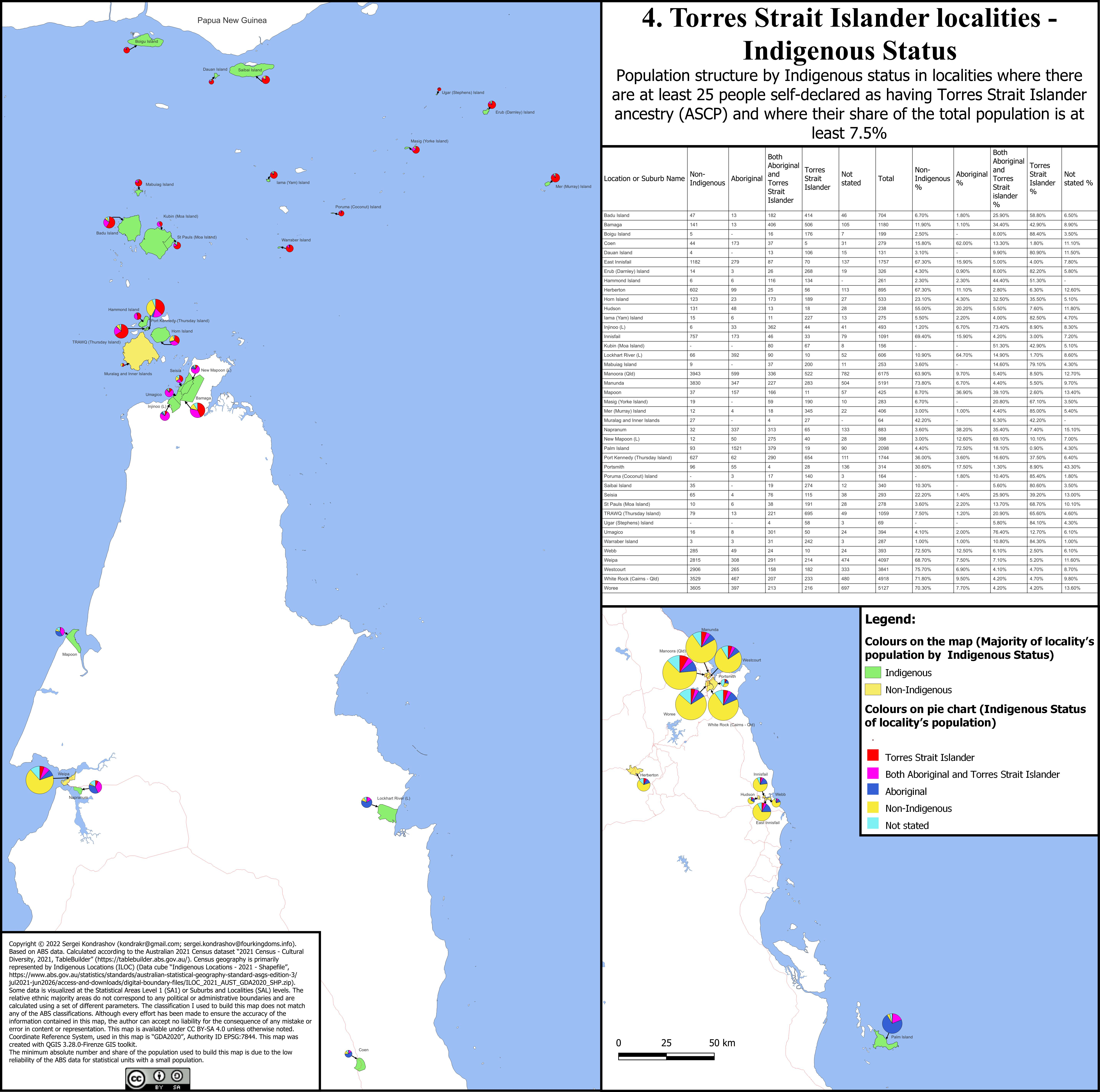
Indigenous status of population in localities with significant share of Torres Strait islander population

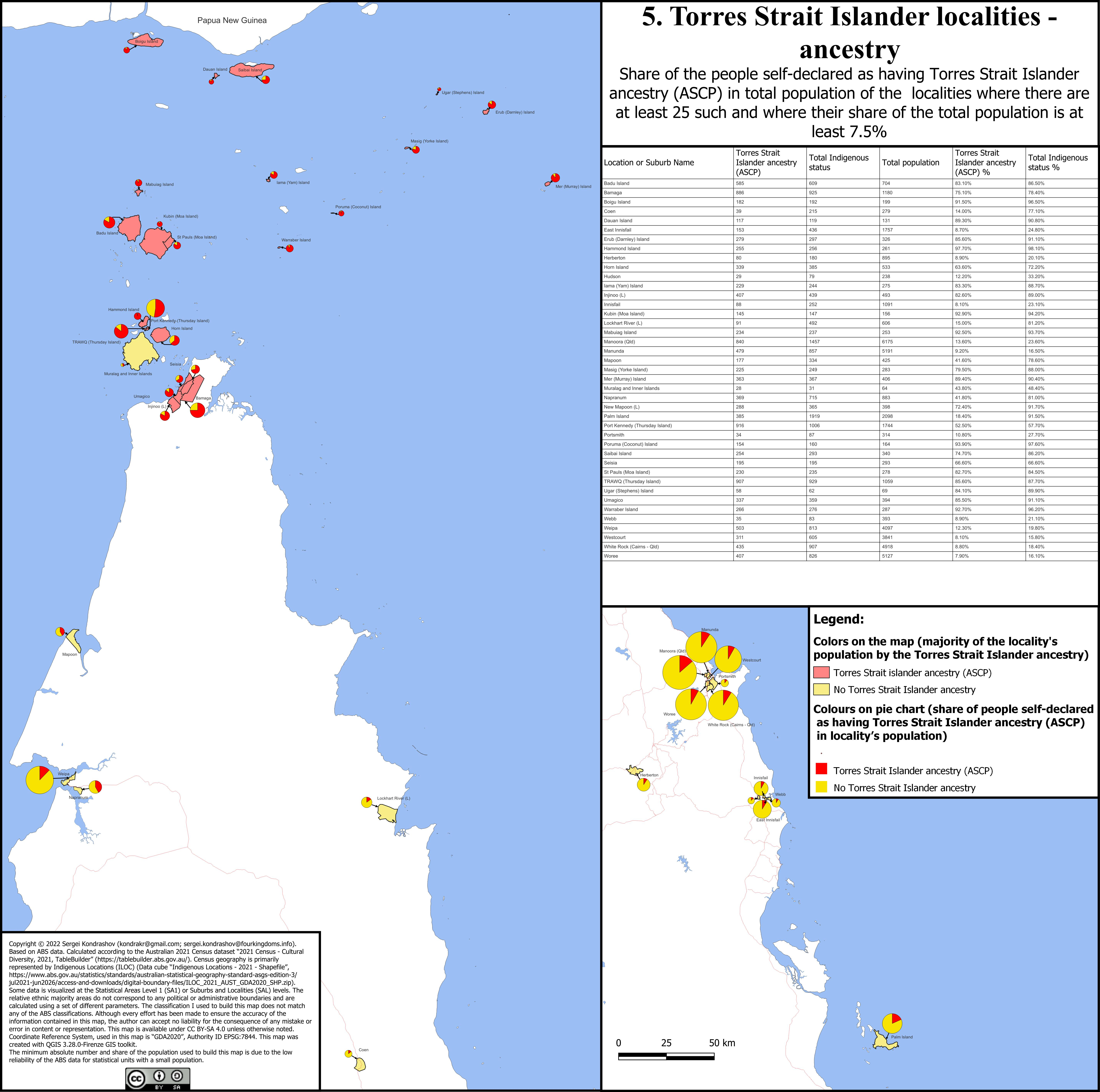
Ancestry of population in localities with significant share of Torres Strait islander population (Torres Strait Islander or other)

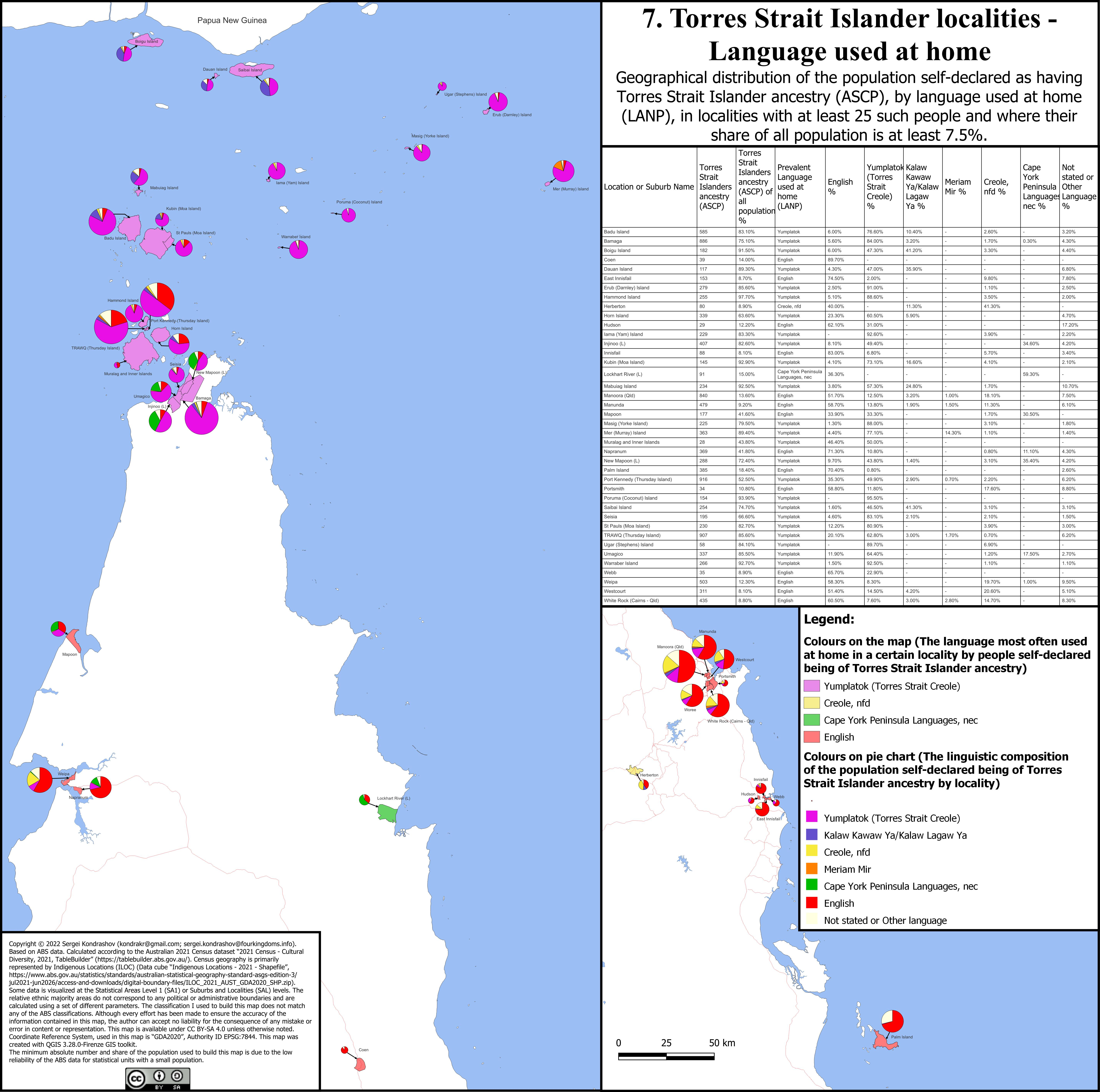
Languages used at home by Torres Strait Islanders in localities with significant share of Torres Strait islander population

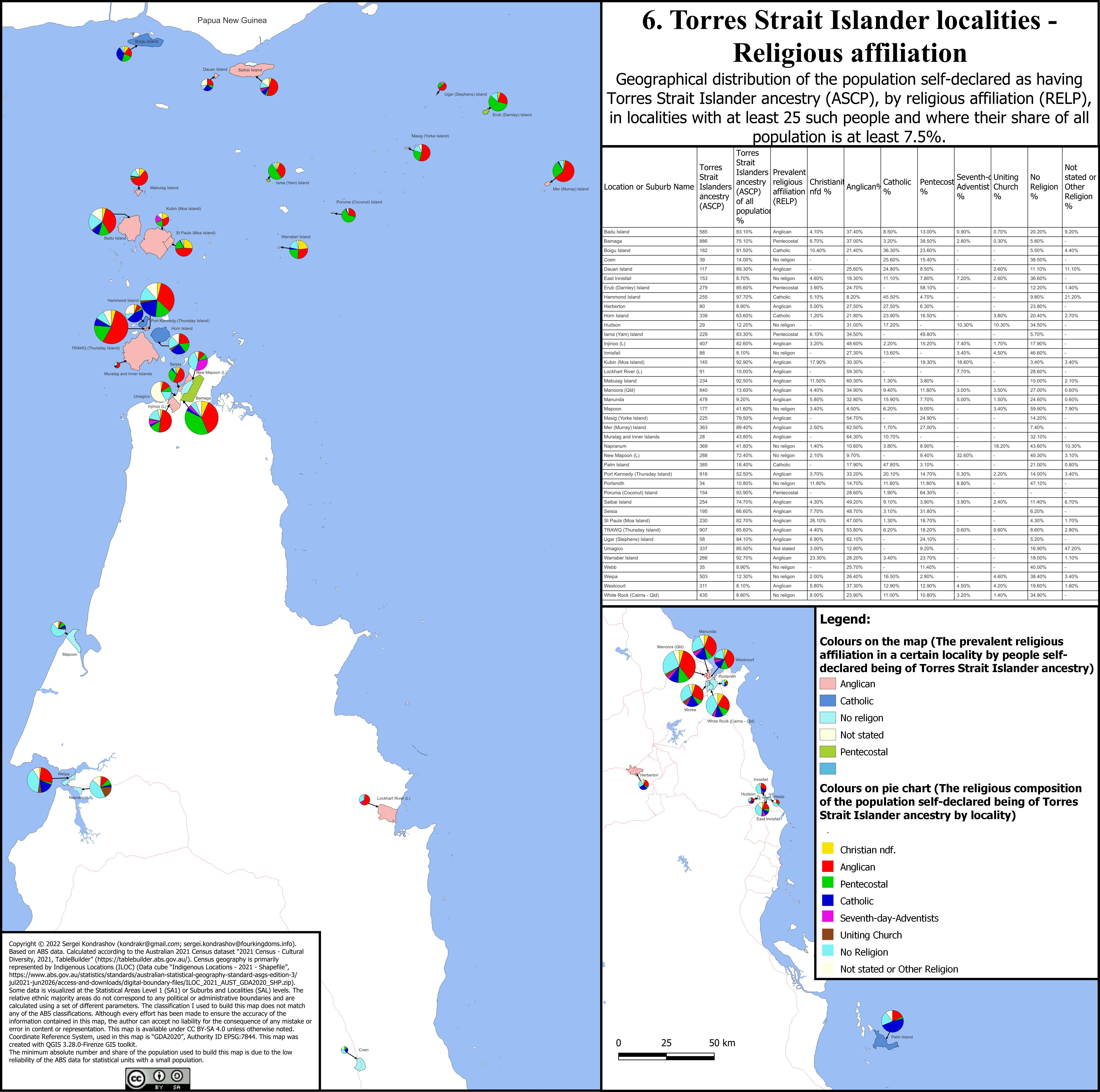
Religious affiliations of Torres Strait islanders in localities with significant share of Torres Strait islander population

=== Other groupings ===
Aboriginal and Torres Strait Islander people also sometimes refer to themselves by descriptions that relate to their ecological environment, such as saltwater people for coast-dwellers (including Torres Strait Islander people), freshwater people, rainforest people, desert people, or spinifex people, (the latter referring to the Pila Nguru of Western Australia).

== History ==
=== Migration to Mainland Australia and Torres Strait Islands ===
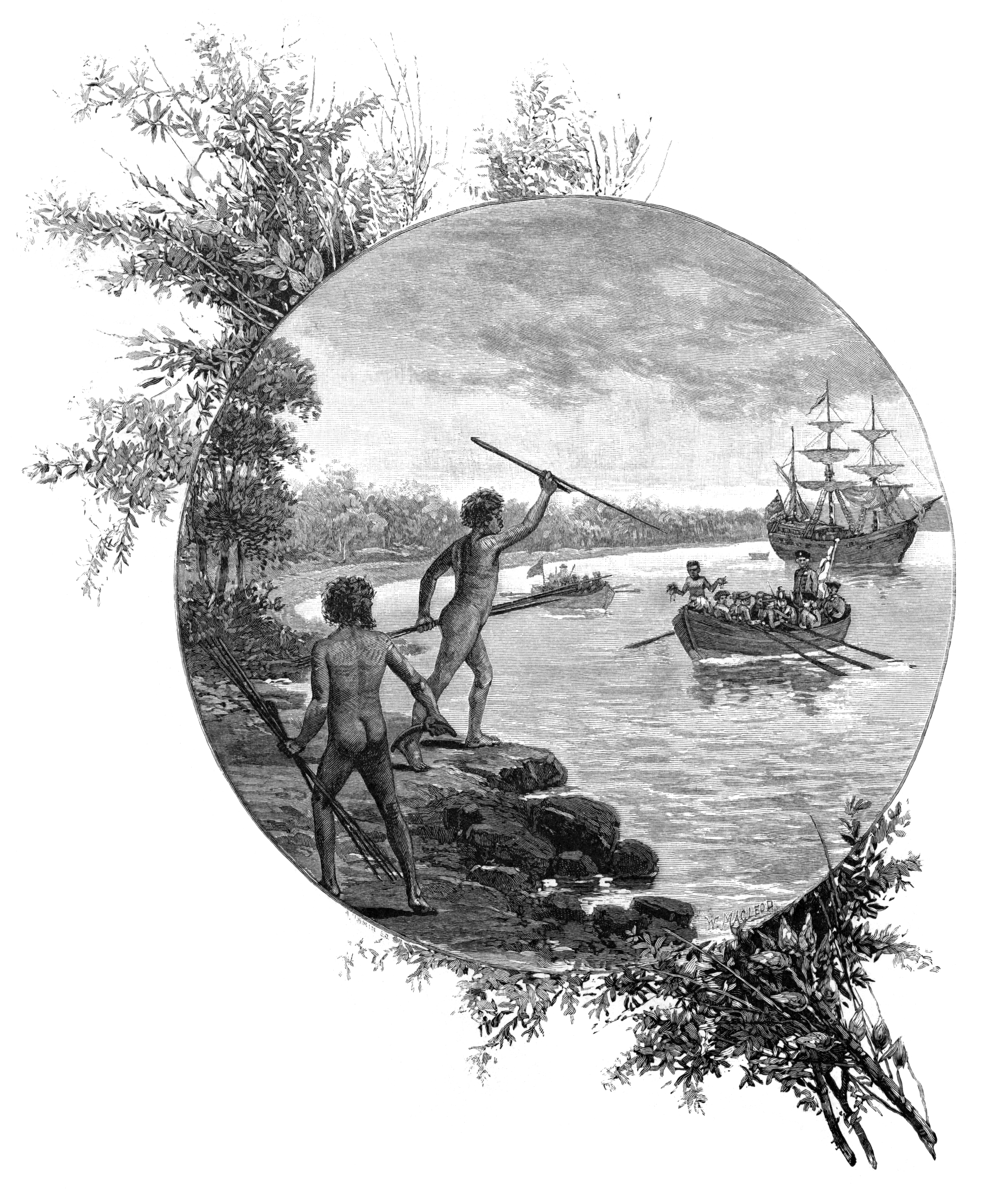
Artwork depicting the first contact that was made with the Gweagal Aboriginal people and Captain James Cook and his crew on the shores of the Kurnell Peninsula, New South Wales

The ancestors of Aboriginal Australians moved into Oceania about 50,000 to 65,000 years ago, during the last glacial period, arriving by land bridges and short sea crossings from Southeast Asia.

The first phase of occupation of the Torres Strait Islands began about 4,000 years ago. By 2,500 years ago more of the islands were occupied and a distinctive Torres Strait Islander maritime culture emerged. Agriculture also developed on some islands and by 700 years ago villages appeared.

Several settlements of humans in Australia have been dated around 49,000 years ago. Luminescence dating of sediments surrounding stone artefacts at Madjedbebe, a rock shelter in northern Australia, indicates human activity as early as 65,000 years BP. Genomic studies, however, suggest that the main wave of modern humans into Australia ancestral to Aboriginal Australians happened as recently as 37,000 to 50,000 years ago. Accordingly, earlier groups either went extinct or contributed around ~2% ancestry to modern Aboriginal Australians. Indigenous Australians and other Oceanians were probably part of the same southern route dispersal as the ancestors of Ancient Ancestral South Indians, Andamanese, and East Asians.

The earliest anatomically modern human remains found in Australia (and outside of Africa) are those of Mungo Man; they have been dated at 42,000 years old. The initial comparison of the mitochondrial DNA from the skeleton known as Lake Mungo 3 (LM3) with that of ancient and modern Aboriginal peoples indicated that Mungo Man is not related to Australian Aboriginal peoples. The sequence has been criticised as there has been no independent testing, and it has been suggested that the results may be due to posthumous modification and thermal degradation of the DNA. Although the contested results seem to indicate that Mungo Man may have been an extinct subspecies that diverged before the most recent common ancestor of contemporary humans, the administrative body for the Mungo National Park believes that modern Aboriginal peoples are descended from the Lake Mungo remains.

It is generally believed that Aboriginal people are the descendants of a single migration into the continent, a people that split from the ancestors of East Asians.

Recent work with mitochondrial DNA suggests a founding population of between 1,000 and 3,000 women produced the genetic diversity observed, which suggests that "initial colonisation of the continent would have required deliberate organised sea travel, involving hundreds of people". Aboriginal people seem to have lived a long time in the same environment as the extinct Australian megafauna.

=== Genetics ===
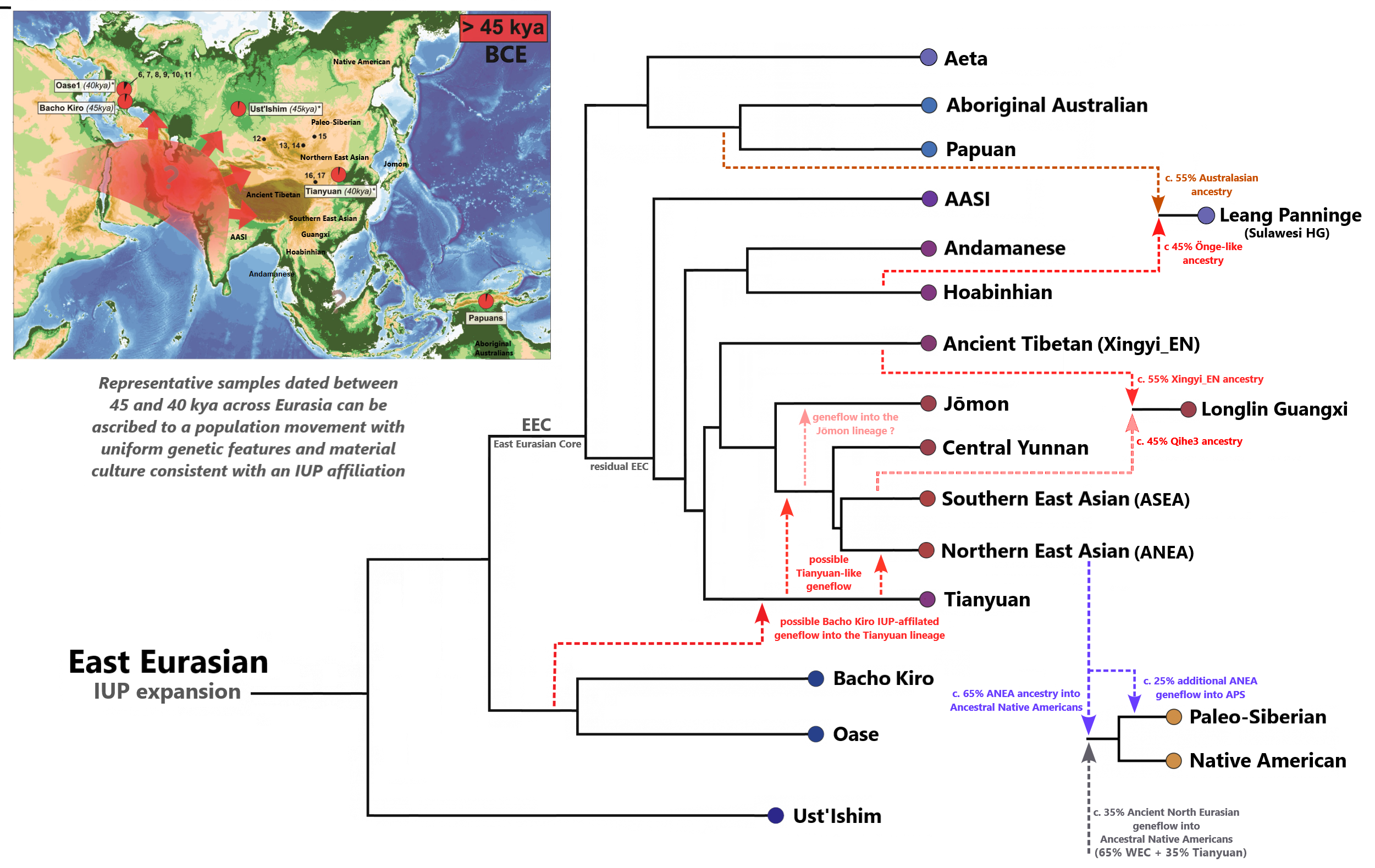
Phylogenetic position of the Aboriginal Australian lineage among other East Eurasians

Genetic studies have suggested that Aboriginal Australians largely descended from an Eastern Eurasian population wave during the Initial Upper Paleolithic, and are most closely related to other Oceanians, such as Melanesians. The Aboriginal Australians also show affinity to Ancient Ancestral South Indians, the Andamanese people, as well as to East Asian peoples. Phylogenetic data suggests that an early initial eastern non-African (ENA) or East-Eurasian meta-population trifurcated, and gave rise to Australasians (Oceanians), the Ancient Ancestral South Indians, Andamanese and the East/Southeast Asian lineage including the ancestors of Native Americans, although Papuans may have also received some geneflow from an earlier group (xOOA) as well, around 2%, next to additional archaic admixture in the Sahul region. (Note: Genetics and material culture support repeated expansions into Paleolithic Eurasia from a population hub out of Africa, Vallini et al. 2022 (4 April 2022) Quote: "Taken together with a lower bound of the final settlement of Sahul at 37 ka (the date of the deepest population splits estimated by Malaspinas et al. 2016), it is reasonable to describe Papuans as either an almost even mixture between East Asians and a lineage basal to West and East Asians occurred sometimes between 45 and 38 ka, or as a sister lineage of East Asians with or without a minor basal OoA or xOoA contribution. We here chose to parsimoniously describe Papuans as a simple sister group of Tianyuan, cautioning that this may be just one out of six equifinal possibilities.")

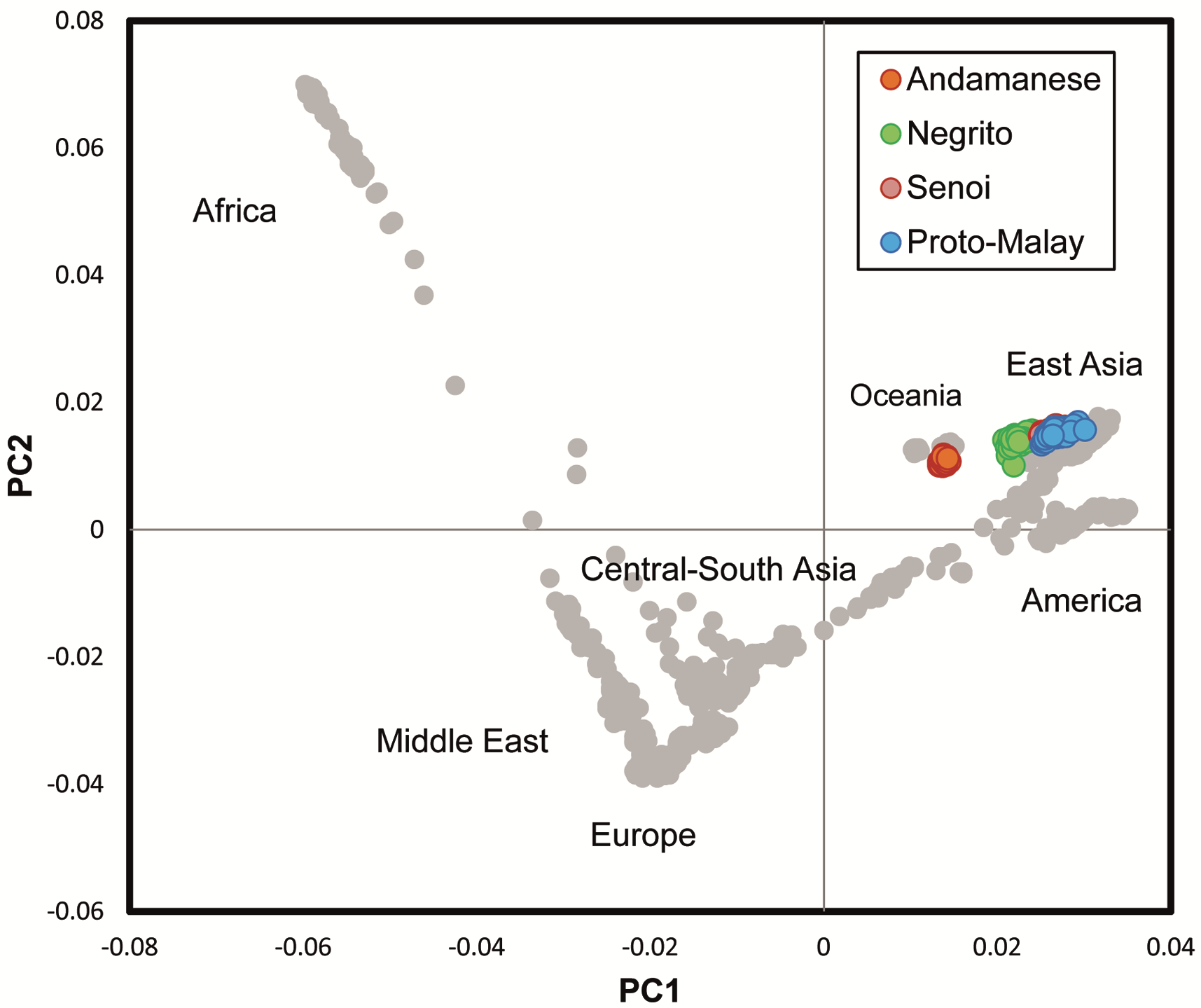
PCA of Orang Asli (Semang) and Andamanese, with worldwide populations in HGDP

Rasmussen et al. 2011 shows that Aboriginal Australians have a lower proportion of European alleles compared to Asians, which they believe is indicative of a multiple dispersal model. Genetically, while Aboriginal Australians are most closely related to Melanesian (including Papuan) people, McEvoy et al. 2010 believed there is also another component that could indicate Ancient Ancestral South Indian admixture or more recent European influence. Research indicates a single founding Sahul group with subsequent isolation between regional populations which were relatively unaffected by later migrations from the Asian mainland, which may have introduced the dingo 4,000–5,000 years ago. The research also suggests a divergence from the Papuan people of New Guinea and the Mamanwa people of the Philippines about 32,000 years ago, with a rapid population expansion about 5,000 years ago. A 2011 genetic study found evidence that the Aboriginal, Papuan and Mamanwa peoples carry some of the alleles associated with the Denisovan peoples of Asia, (not found amongst populations in mainland Asia) suggesting that modern and archaic humans interbred in Asia approximately 44,000 years ago, before Australia separated from New Guinea and the migration to Australia. A 2012 paper reports that there is also evidence of a substantial genetic flow from India to northern Australia estimated at slightly over four thousand years ago, a time when changes in tool technology and food processing appear in the Australian archaeological record, suggesting that these may be related. Bergström et al 2016 and Nagle et al 2016 could not replicate the 2012 study, noting that Indigenous Australians split from mainland Asia 50,000 years ago. Mallick et al. 2016 and Mark Lipson et al. 2017 study found that the bifurcation of Eastern Eurasian and Western Eurasian dates back to least 45,000 years ago, with Australasians nested inside the Eastern Eurasian clade. Vallini et al. 2024 noted that the divergence between Ancient East Eurasians and West Eurasians most likely occurred on the Persian Plateau >48,000 years ago, with East Eurasians dispersing throughout the Asia-Pacific region >45,000 years ago.

==== Uniparentals ====
Aboriginal Australian men have haplogroup C-M347 in high frequencies with peak estimates ranging from 60.2% to 68.7%. In addition, the basal form K2* (K-M526) of the extremely ancient haplogroup K2 – whose subclades haplogroup R, haplogroup Q, haplogroup M and haplogroup S can be found in the majority of Europeans, South Asians, Native Americans and the Indigenous peoples of Oceania – has only been found in living humans today amongst Aboriginal Australians. 27% of them may carry K2* and approximately 29% of Aboriginal Australian males belong to subclades of K2b1, also known as M and S.

Aboriginal Australians possess deep rooted clades of both mtDNA haplogroup M and haplogroup N.

=== Before European contact ===
==== Aboriginal people ====
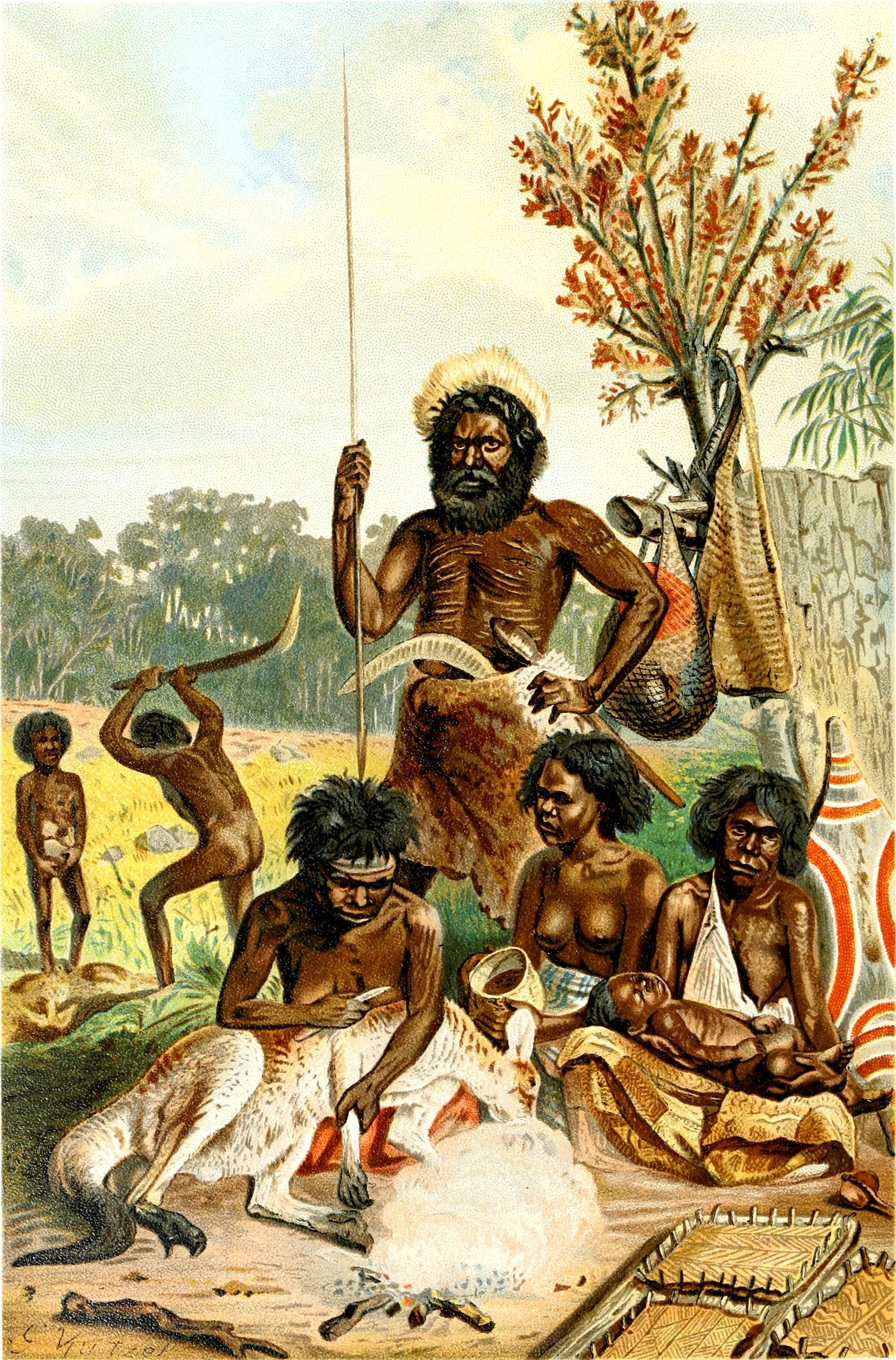
Aboriginal Australians, from Ridpath's Universal History

Aboriginal people lived as foragers and hunter-gatherers. Although Aboriginal society was generally mobile, or semi-nomadic, moving according to the changing food availability found across different areas as seasons changed, the mode of life and material cultures varied greatly from region to region. The greatest population density was to be found in the southern and eastern regions of the continent, the River Murray valley in particular.

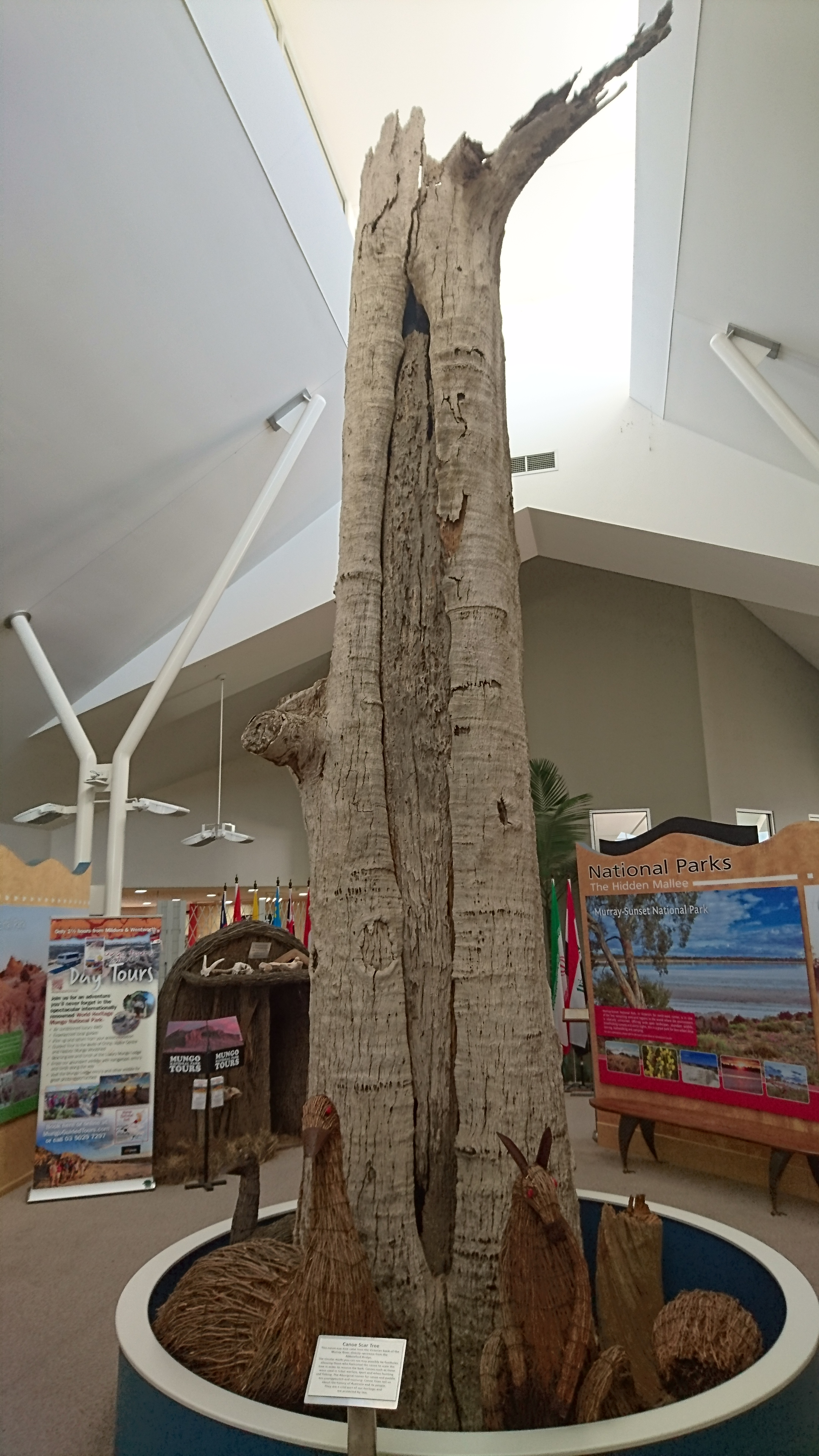
The scarred tree where Aboriginal people removed its bark to make a canoe, for use on the Murray River. It was identified near Mildura, Victoria, in the Mildura Visitor Centre

There is some evidence that, before outside contact, some groups of Aboriginal Australians had a complex subsistence system that was only recorded by the first European explorers. One early settler took notes on the life styles of the Wathaurung people whom he lived near in Victoria. He saw women harvesting murnong tubers, a native yam that has become almost extinct. However, the area that they were harvesting was already cleared of other plants, making it easier to harvest murnong (also known as yam daisy) exclusively.

Along the northern coast of Australia, parsnip yams were harvested by leaving the bottom part of the yam still stuck in the ground so that it would grow again in the same spot. Aboriginal peoples used slash-and-burn techniques to enrich the nutrients of their soil. However, sheep and cattle later brought over by Europeans would ruin this soil by trampling on it. They deliberately exchanged seeds to begin growing plants where they did not naturally occur. Norman Tindale was able to draw an Aboriginal grain belt, detailing the specific areas where plants were once produced.

In terms of aquaculture, explorer Thomas Mitchell noted large stone fish traps on the Darling River at Brewarrina. Each trap covers a pool, herding fish through a small entrance that would later be shut. Traps were created at different heights to accommodate different water levels during floods and droughts.

Technology used by Indigenous Australian societies before European contact included weapons, tools, shelters, watercraft, and the message stick. Weapons included boomerangs, spears (sometimes thrown with a woomera) with stone or fishbone tips, clubs, and (less commonly) axes. The Stone Age tools available included knives with ground edges, grinding devices, and eating containers. Fibrecraft was well-developed, and fibre nets, baskets, and bags were used for fishing, hunting, and carrying liquids. Trade networks spanned the continent, and transportation included canoes. Shelters varied regionally, and included wiltjas in the Atherton Tablelands, paperbark and stringybark sheets and raised platforms in Arnhem Land, whalebone huts in what is now South Australia, stone shelters in what became western Victoria, and a multi-room pole and bark structure found in Corranderrk. A bark tent or lean-to is known as a humpy, gunyah, or wurley. Clothing included the possum-skin cloak in the southeast, buka cloak in the southwest and riji (pearl shells) in the northeast.

There is evidence that some Aboriginal populations in northern Australia regularly traded with Makassan fishermen from Indonesia before the arrival of Europeans.

==== Population ====
The Indigenous population prior to British settlement has been estimated from 300,000 to more than 3,000,000. Recent archaeological finds suggest that a population of 500,000 to 750,000 could have been sustained, with some ecologists estimating that a population of one million to two million people was possible.

The geographic distribution of the pre-contact population is a matter of academic debate. Pardoe argues that the distribution was similar to that of the current Australian population, the majority living in the south-east, centred along the Murray River. However, Evans suggests that the area which became Queensland was the most densely populated.

In 2011, Ørsted-Jensen proposed the following distribution of the pre-contact population:

Estimated distribution of the Aboriginal population between the current states and territories (Note: Statistics compiled by Ørsted-Jensen for Frontier History Revisited (Brisbane 2011), page 10-11 & 15. Column one is the distribution percentage calculated on the estimates gathered and publicised in 1930 (Official Year Book of the Commonwealth of Australia XXIII, 1930, pp672, 687–696) by the social anthropologist Alfred Reginald Radcliffe-Brown. The percentage in column two was calculated on the basis of N. G. Butlin: Our Original Aggression and "others", by M. D. Prentis for his book A Study in Black and White (2 revised edition, Redfern NSW 1988, page 41). Column three however, is calculated on the basis of the "Aboriginal Australia" map, published by Australian Institute of Aboriginal and Torres Strait Islander Studies (AIATSIS), Canberra 1994.)
State/territory	Estimates of population share		Pre-contact
State/territory	1930	1988	Pre-contact
Queensland	38.2%	37.9%	34.2%
Western Australia	19.7%	20.2%	22.1%
Northern Territory	15.9%	12.6%	17.2%
New South Wales	15.3%	18.9%	10.3%
Victoria	4.8%	5.7%	5.7%
South Australia	4.8%	4.0%	8.6%
Tasmania	1.4%	0.6%	2.0%

==== Torres Strait Island people ====
The Torres Strait peoples' fishing economy relied on boats, which they built themselves. There is also evidence of the construction of large, complex buildings on stilts and domed structures using bamboo, with thatched roofs, which catered for extended family members living together.

=== British colonisation ===
==== First contact ====
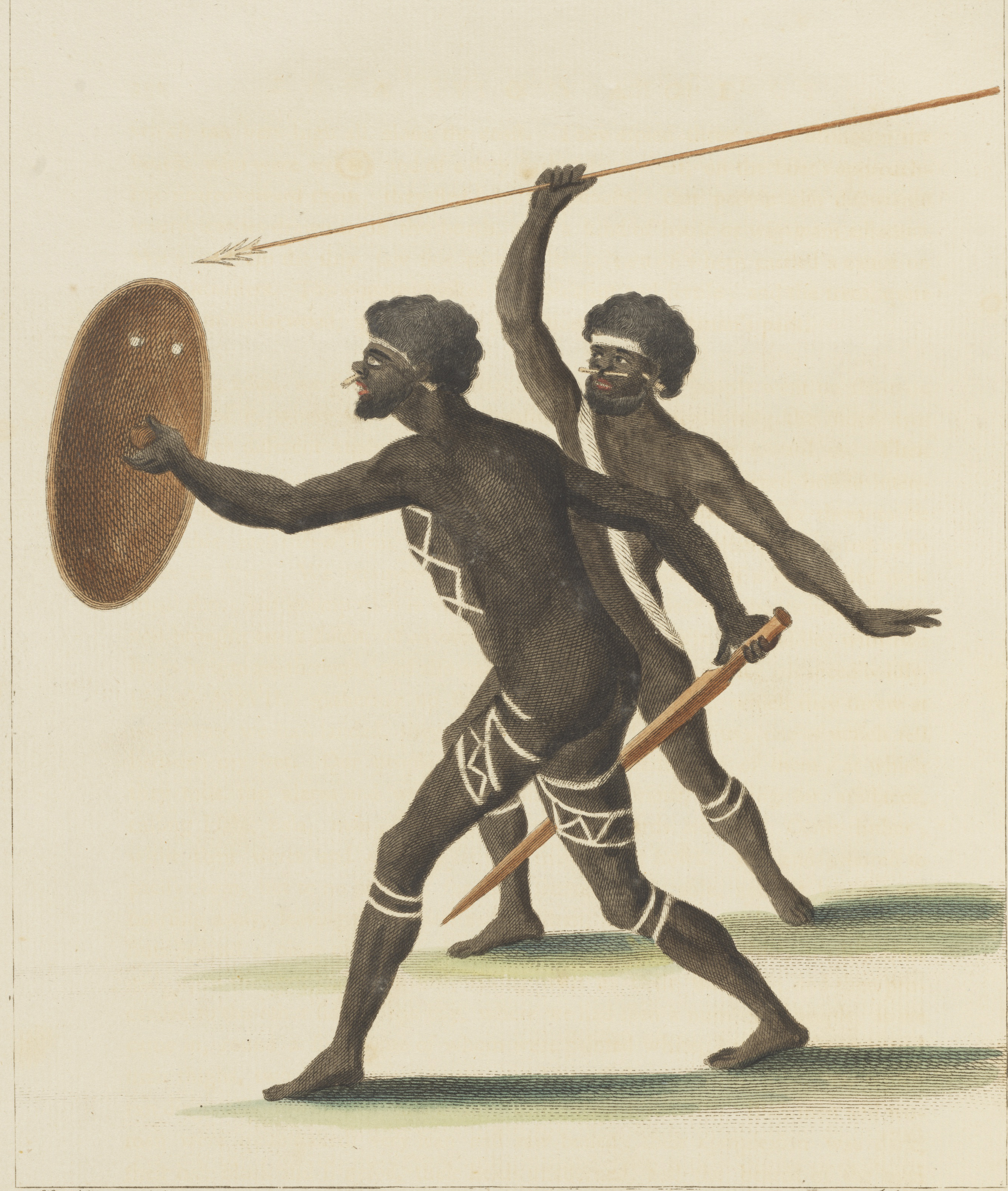
A 1770 sketch of two Aboriginal men by the British explorer James Cook's illustrator Sidney Parkinson

British exploration of the Australian coastline began with the buccaneer William Dampier in 1688 and 1699. Dampier was impressed neither by the country nor the people of the west Australian coast. Almost a century later, the explorer James Cook mapped the east coast of Australia and claimed the territory for Britain in the name of King George III. Cook was impressed both by the land and the people whom he encountered, writing in his journal: "From what I have said of the Natives of New Holland they may appear to some to be the most wretched people upon Earth, but in reality they are far more happier than we Europeans; being wholy unacquainted not only with the superfluous but the necessary conveniencies so much sought after in Europe, they are happy in not knowing the use of them. They live in a Tranquillity which is not disturb'd by the Inequality of Condition".

Nevertheless, Cook also noted in his journal two men at Botany Bay who "seem'd resolved to oppose" his first landing. According to Cook, after one of the men threw a rock, Cook fired a musquet loaded with small shott, which struck him with little effect. Some shott was lodged into one of the men's shields and was taken back to England by Cook, where it remains in the British Museum.

Cook spent a greater period of time among the Guugu Yimithirr people around modern Cooktown in Queensland, where his ship was nearly wrecked on the Great Barrier Reef. Here relations were generally amicable and Cook recorded words from their language including "kangaroo", though a fight broke out when the British took turtles from the river without sharing them. Peace was restored when an elder presented Cook with a broken-tipped spear as a peace offering – remembered as a first "act of reconciliation". The encounter is since commemorated annually by the Guugu Yimithirr.

Cook's favourable impression of the East Coast of Australia led directly to the commencement of the British colonisation of Australia, commencing at Sydney in 1788. The First Fleet of British ships was commanded by Governor Arthur Phillip, who had been instructed to "endeavour by every possible means to open an intercourse with the natives, and to conciliate their affections", and to enjoin his British subjects to "live in amity and kindness with them" so as "to cultivate an acquaintance with them without their having an idea of our great superiority over them".

==== Dates by area ====
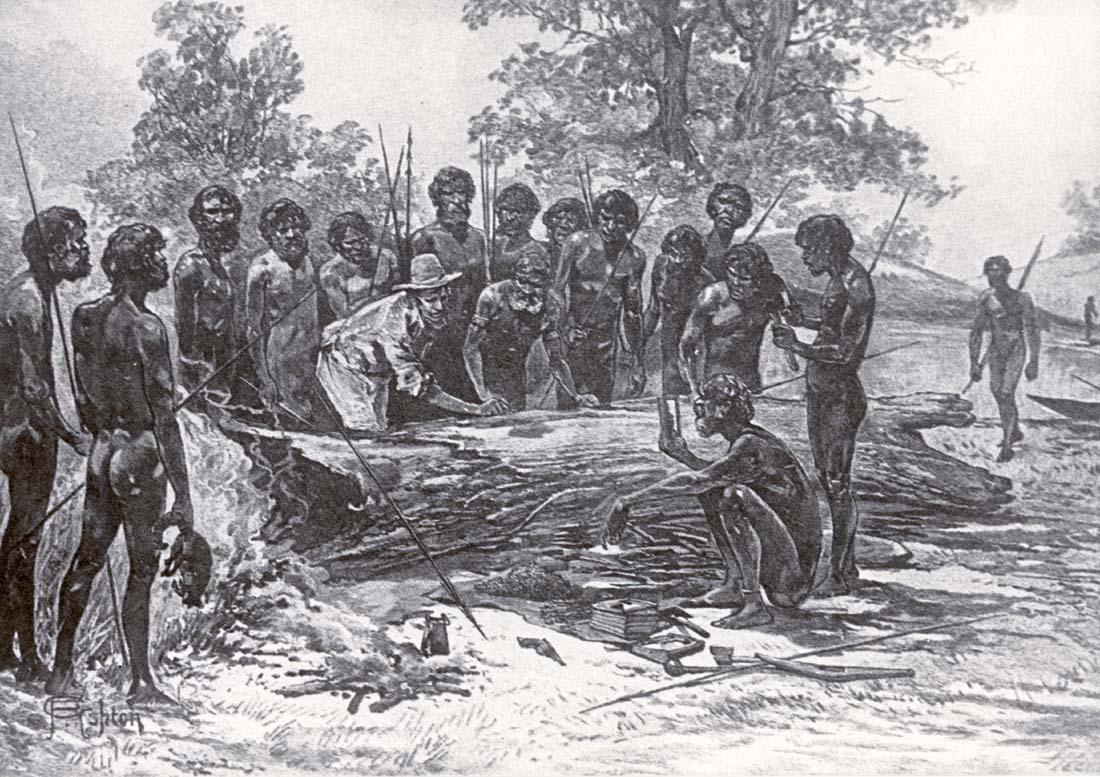
Wurundjeri people at the signing of Batman's Treaty, 1835

British colonisation of Australia began with the arrival of the First Fleet in Botany Bay, New South Wales, in 1788. Settlements were subsequently established in Tasmania (1803), Victoria (1803), Queensland (1824), Western Australia (1826), and the Colony of South Australia (1836).

The first settlement in the Northern Territory was built after Captain Gordon Bremer took possession of the Tiwi Islands of Bathurst and Melville, claiming them for the colony of New South Wales, although that settlement failed after a few years, along with a couple of later attempts; permanent settlement was only finally achieved at Darwin in 1869.

Australia was the exception to British imperial colonisation practices, in that no treaty was drawn up setting out terms of agreement between the settlers and native proprietors, as was the case in North America and New Zealand. Many of the men on the First Fleet had had military experience among Native American tribes in North America, and tended to attribute to the Aboriginal people alien and misleading systems or concepts like chieftainship and tribe with which they had become acquainted in the northern hemisphere.

British administrative control began in the Torres Strait Islands in 1862, with the appointment of John Jardine, police magistrate at Rockhampton, as Government Resident in the Torres Straits. He established a small settlement on Albany Island, but on 1 August 1864 he went to Somerset Island. English missionaries arrived on Erub (Darnley Island) on 1 July 1871. In 1872 the boundary of Queensland was extended to include Thursday Island and some other islands in Torres Strait within 60 miles (97 km) of the Queensland coast, and in 1879 Queensland annexed the other islands, which became part of the British colony of Queensland.

==== Impact ====
One immediate consequence was a series of epidemics of European diseases such as measles, smallpox and tuberculosis. In the 19th century, smallpox was the principal cause of Aboriginal deaths, and vaccinations of the "native inhabitants" had begun in earnest by the 1840s. This smallpox epidemic in 1789 is estimated to have killed up to 90% of the Darug people. The cause of the outbreak is disputed. Some scholars have attributed it to European settlers, but it is also argued that Macassan fishermen from South Sulawesi and nearby islands may have introduced smallpox to Australia before the arrival of Europeans. A third suggestion is that the outbreak was caused by contact with members of the First Fleet. A fourth theory is that the epidemic was of chickenpox, not smallpox, carried by members of the First Fleet, and to which the Aboriginal people also had no immunity. Moreover, Aboriginal people were infected with sexually transmitted infections, especially syphilis and gonorrhea.

Another consequence of British colonisation was European seizure of land and water resources, with the decimation of kangaroo and other food sources which continued throughout the 19th and early 20th centuries as rural lands were converted for sheep and cattle grazing. Settlers also participated in the rape and forcible prostitution of Aboriginal women.

Some Europeans, for example escaped convicts, lived in Aboriginal and Torres Strait Islander communities.

In 1834 there occurred the first recorded use of Aboriginal trackers, who proved very adept at navigating their way through the Australian landscape and finding people.

During the 1860s, Tasmanian Aboriginal skulls were particularly sought internationally for studies into craniofacial anthropometry. The skeleton of Truganini, a Tasmanian Aboriginal who died in 1876, was exhumed within two years of her death despite her pleas, by the Royal Society of Tasmania, and later placed on display. Campaigns continue to have Aboriginal body parts returned to Australia for burial; Truganini's body was returned in 1976 and cremated, and her ashes were scattered according to her wishes.

Place names sometimes reveal discrimination, such as Mount Jim Crow in Rockhampton, Queensland (now Mount Baga), as well as racist policies, like Brisbane's Boundary Streets, which used to indicate boundaries where Aboriginal people were not allowed to cross during certain times of the day. There is ongoing discussion about changing many of these names.

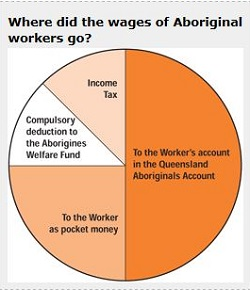
Graph showing the destination of Indigenous wages in Queensland in the 19th and 20th centuries

Throughout most of the 19th and 20th centuries, Aboriginal and Torres Strait Islander people had their lives under the jurisdiction of various state-based protection laws. These Acts of Parliament appointed Protectors of Aborigines and Aboriginal Protection Boards, whose role was to control the lives of Indigenous Australians. Wages were controlled by the Protectors, and Indigenous Australians received less income than their non-Indigenous counterparts in employment.

During this time, many Aboriginal people were victims of slavery by colonists alongside Pacific Islander peoples who were kidnapped from their homes, in a practice known as blackbirding. Between 1860 and 1970, under the guise of protectionist policies, people, including children as young as 12, were forced to work on properties under horrific conditions and most did not receive any wages. In the pearling industry, Aboriginal peoples were bought for about 5 pounds, with pregnant Aboriginal women "prized because their lungs were believed to have greater air capacity". Aboriginal prisoners in the Aboriginal-only prison on Rottnest Island, many of whom were there on trumped up charges, were chained up and forced to work. In 1971, 373 Aboriginal men were found buried in unmarked graves on the island. Up until June 2018, the former prison was used as holiday accommodation.

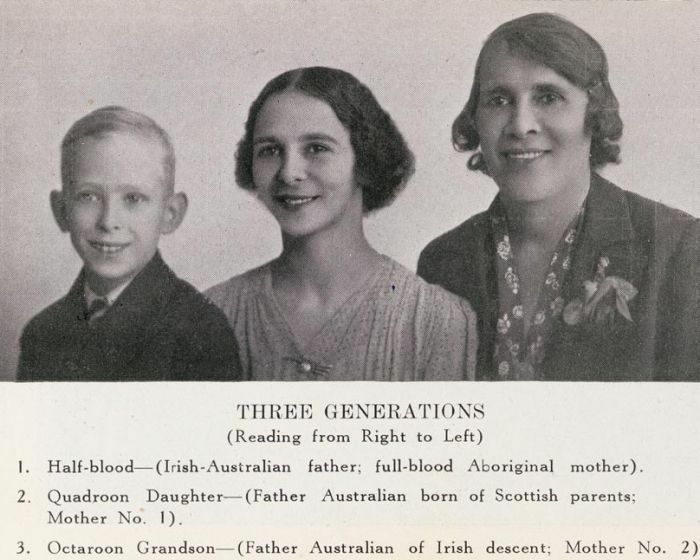
The successive breeding out of "colour" in the Aboriginal population as part of assimilation policies, demonstrated here in A. O. Neville's "Australia's coloured minority" book

From 1810, Aboriginal peoples were moved onto mission stations run by churches and the state. After this period of protectionist policies that aimed to segregate and control Aboriginal populations, in 1937 the Commonwealth government agreed to move towards assimilation. Its policies changed to integrate Aboriginal persons who were "not of full blood" into the white community in an effort to eliminate the "Aboriginal problem". As part of this, there was an increase in the number of children forcibly removed from their homes and placed with white people, either in institutions or foster homes.

==== Frontier wars and massacres ====
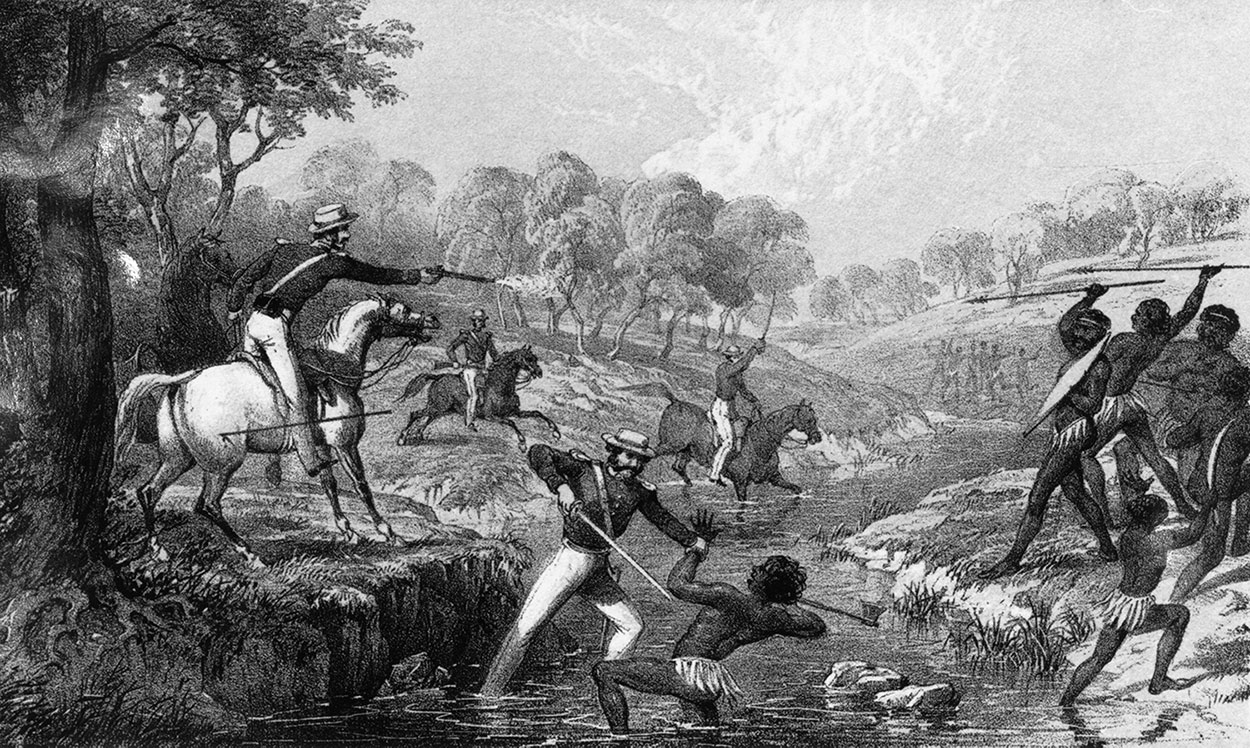
New South Wales Mounted Police killing Aboriginal warriors during the Waterloo Creek massacre, 1838

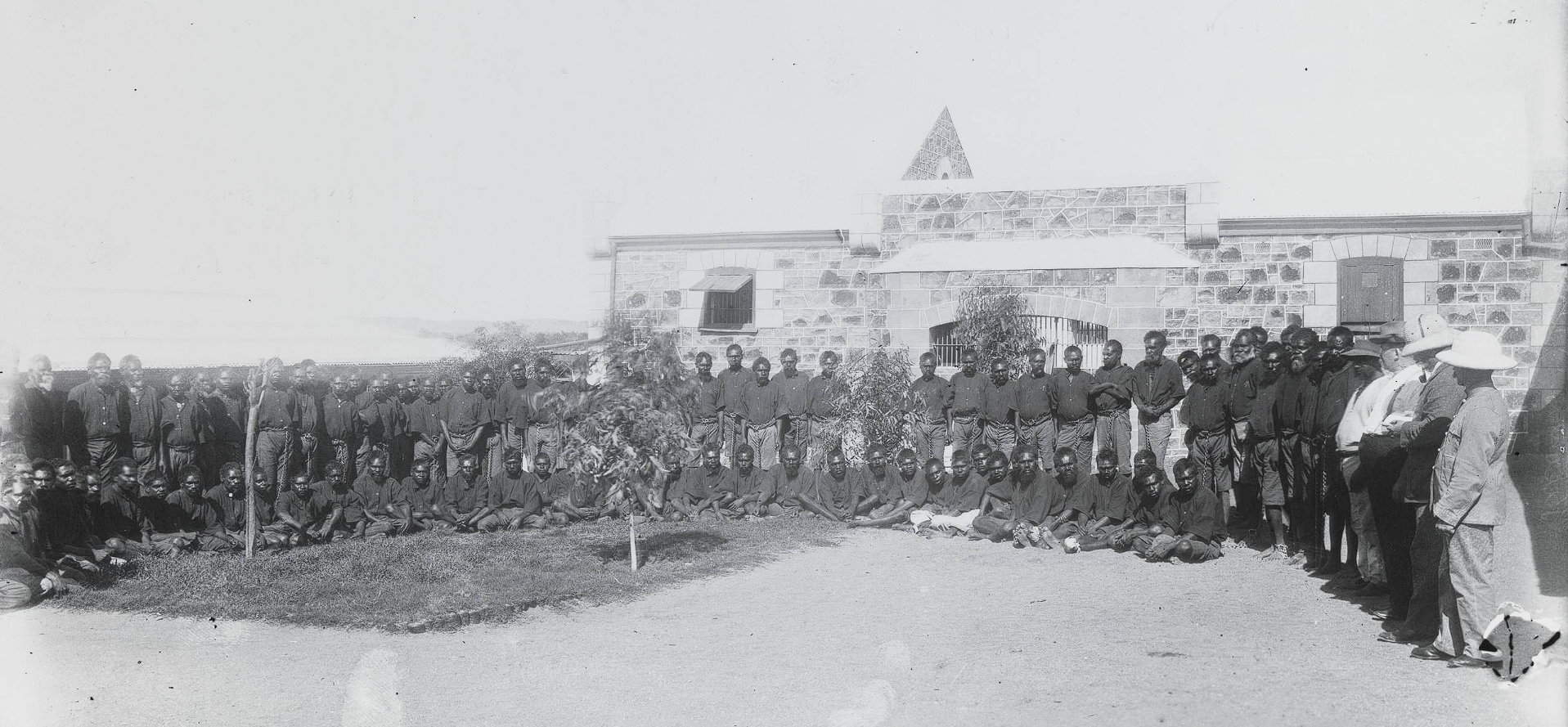
Aboriginal prisoners on Rottnest Island, 1883

As part of the colonisation process, there were many conflicts and clashes between colonists and Aboriginal and Torres Strait Islander people across the continent and islands. In Queensland, the killing of Aboriginal peoples was largely perpetrated by civilian "hunting" parties and the Native Police, armed groups of Aboriginal men who were recruited at gunpoint and led by government officers to eliminate Aboriginal resistance. There is evidence that massacres of Aboriginal and Torres Strait Islander peoples, which began with arrival of British colonists, continued until the 1930s. Researchers at the University of Newcastle under Lyndall Ryan have been mapping the massacres. as of 2020 they have mapped almost 500 places where massacres happened, with 12,361 Aboriginal people killed and 204 Colonists killed, numbering at least 311 massacres over a period of about 140 years. After losing a significant number of their social unit in one blow, the survivors were left vulnerable – with reduced ability to gather food, reproduce, or fulfill their ceremonial obligations, as well as defend themselves against further attack.

Estimating the total number of deaths during the frontier wars is difficult due to lack of records and the fact that many massacres of Aboriginal and Torres Strait Islander were kept secret. It is often quoted that 20,000 Aboriginal Australians and 2000 colonists died in the frontier wars; however, recent research indicates at least 40,000 Aboriginal dead and 2,000 to 2,500 settlers dead. Other research indicates a minimum of 65,000 Aboriginal peoples may have been killed in Queensland alone.

There have been arguments over whether deaths of Aboriginal peoples, particularly in Tasmania, as well as the forcible removal of children from Aboriginal communities, constitutes genocide. There has been a broad range of historical research on the massacres and treatment of Aboriginal peoples, including by Lyndall Ryan at the Centre for 21st Century Humanities, the Frontier Conflict Database, and the Australian Commonwealth government's Human Rights and Equal Opportunity Commission (HREOC) Report of the National Inquiry into the Separation of Aboriginal and Torres Strait Islander Children From their Families.

According to the analysis of Justice Ronald Wilson in the Human Rights and Equal Opportunity Report Australia's policy of forcible removal was genocidal in nature. Quoting Raphael Lemkin, Wilson defined genocide as "a coordinated plan of different actions aimed at the destruction of the essential foundations of the lives of national groups, with the aim of annihilating the groups themselves." The objectives of which were "the disintegration of the political and social institutions, of culture, language, national feelings, religion, and the economic existence of national groups, the destruction of personal security, liberty, health, dignity, and even the lives of the individuals belonging to such groups."

Wilson states that "Genocide can be committed by means other than actual physical extermination. It is committed by the forcible transfer of children, provided the other elements of the crime are established." He points out that "Genocide is committed even when the destruction has not been carried out. A conspiracy to commit genocide and an attempt at genocide are both crimes which are committed whether or not any actual destruction occurred." Further, Wilson found that "The debates at the time of the drafting of the Genocide Convention establish clearly that an act or policy is still genocidal when it is motivated by a number of objectives. To constitute an act of genocide the planned extermination of a group need not be solely motivated by animosity or hatred."...and that "reasonable foreseeability...is sufficient to establish the Convention's intent element." He concluded that "The policy of forcible removal of children from Indigenous Australians to other groups for the purpose of raising them separately from and ignorant of their culture and people could properly be labelled 'genocidal' in breach of binding international law from at least 11 December 1946...The practice continued for almost another quarter of a century."

There are few memorials in Australia acknowledging the widespread massacres of Aboriginal peoples, and no memorials describing it as genocide. However, the massacres were often recorded by Australians as place names, for example: Murdering Gully in Newcastle, Murdering Creek at Lake Weyba, Skull Pocket and Skeleton Creek near Cairns, Rifle Creek near Mt Molloy Qld, Skull Lagoon near Mt Carbine Qld, Skull Hole near Winton Qld, Battle Camp Road, Range and Station east of Laura Qld, Slaughterhouse Creek (Waterloo Creek) NSW.

=== 1871–1969: Stolen Generations ===
The Stolen Generations were those children of Australian Aboriginal and Torres Strait Islander descent who were forcibly removed from their families by the Australian federal and state government agencies and church missions for the purpose of eradicating Aboriginal culture, under acts of their respective parliaments. (Note: Bringing them Home, The general principle was that those who were identified as purely Aboriginal were left alone, because it was assumed that they would die out in a few generations, but part-Aboriginal people were "rescued" so that they could be brought up like white children. A few may have benefited from this, but for a majority of them separation from their families was distressing. Appendices listing and interpretation of state acts regarding "Aborigines": Appendix 1.1 NSW; Appendix 1.2 ACT; Appendix 2 Victoria; Appendix 3 Queensland; Tasmania; Appendix 5 Western Australia; Appendix 6 South Australia; Appendix 7 Northern Territory) The forcible removal of these children occurred in the period between approximately 1871 and 1969, although in some places children were still being taken in the 1970s. (Note: In its submission to the Bringing Them Home report, the Victorian government stated that "despite the apparent recognition in government reports that the interests of Indigenous children were best served by keeping them in their own communities, the number of Aboriginal children forcibly removed continued to increase, rising from 220 in 1973 to 350 in 1976" Bringing Them Home: "Victoria".)

=== Early 20th century ===
By 1900, the recorded indigenous population of Australia had declined to approximately 93,000. However, this was only a partial count, as both Aboriginal people and Torres Strait Islanders were poorly covered, with desert Aboriginal peoples not counted at all until the 1930s. During the first half of the twentieth century, many indigenous Australians worked as stockmen on sheep stations and cattle stations for extremely low wages. The indigenous population continued to decline, reaching a low of 74,000 in 1933 before numbers began to recover. By 1995, the population had reached pre-colonisation levels, and in 2010 there were around 563,000 indigenous Australians.

Although, as British subjects, all indigenous Australians were nominally entitled to vote, generally only those who merged into mainstream society did so. Only Western Australia and Queensland specifically excluded Aboriginal and Torres Strait Islander people from the electoral rolls. Despite the Commonwealth Franchise Act 1902, which excluded "Aboriginal natives of Australia, Asia, Africa and Pacific Islands except New Zealand" from voting unless they were on the roll before 1901, South Australia insisted that all voters enfranchised within its borders would remain eligible to vote in the Commonwealth, and Aboriginal and Torres Strait Islander people continued to be added to their rolls, albeit haphazardly.

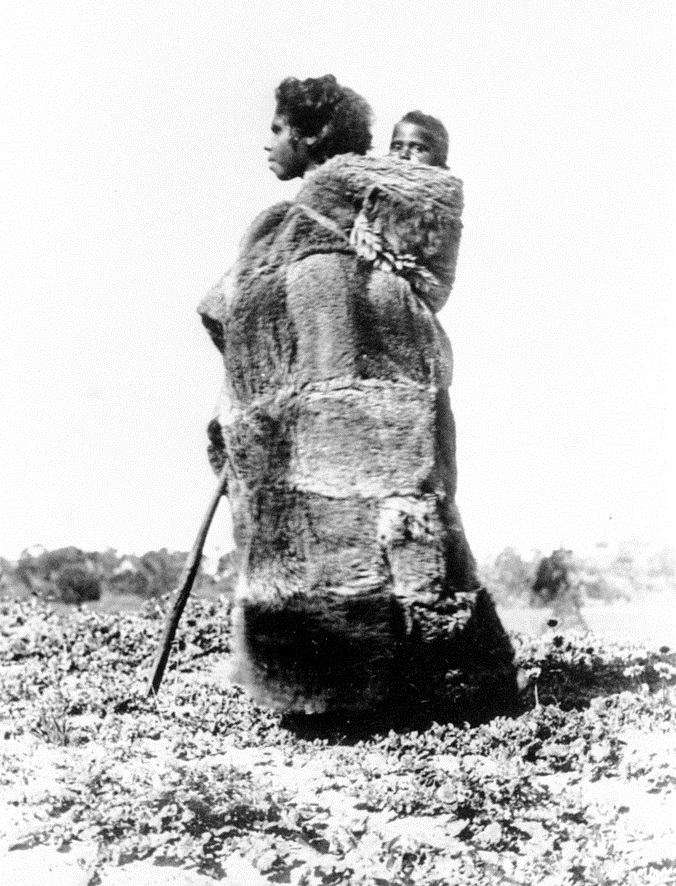
Aboriginal women carrying a child wrapped in pelt cloak, South Australia, c. 1860

Despite efforts to bar their enlistment, over 1,000 indigenous Australians fought for Australia in the First World War.

1934 saw the first appeal to the High Court by an Aboriginal Australian, and it succeeded. Dhakiyarr was found to have been wrongly convicted of the murder of a white policeman, for which he had been sentenced to death; the case focused national attention on Aboriginal rights issues. Dhakiyarr disappeared upon release. In 1938, the 150th anniversary of the arrival of the British First Fleet was marked as a Day of Mourning and Protest at an Aboriginal meeting in Sydney, and has since become marked around Australia as "Invasion Day" or "Survival Day" by Aboriginal protesters and their supporters.

Hundreds of indigenous Australians served in the Australian armed forces during World War Two – including with the Torres Strait Light Infantry Battalion and The Northern Territory Special Reconnaissance Unit, which were established to guard Australia's North against the threat of Japanese invasion. However, most were denied pension rights and military allotments, except in Victoria, where each case was judged individually, without a blanket denial of rights accruing from their service. (Note: Indigenous people across Australia and other colonist societies – Canada, New Zealand and South Africa – did not gain equal access to their repatriation benefits and military wages. In contrast to other Australian states, Aboriginal authorities in Victoria did not systematically deny Aboriginal people military allotments and pensions, but judged each case on its "merits" (Horton 2015, p. 205).)

=== Late 20th century ===
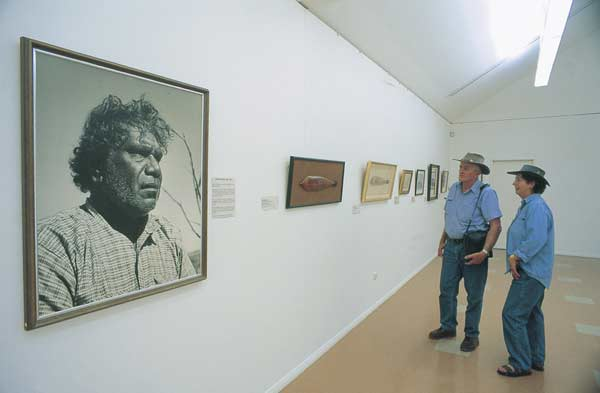
Picture of Albert Namatjira at the Albert Namatjira Gallery, Alice Springs. Aboriginal art and artists became increasingly prominent in Australian cultural life during the second half of the 20th century.

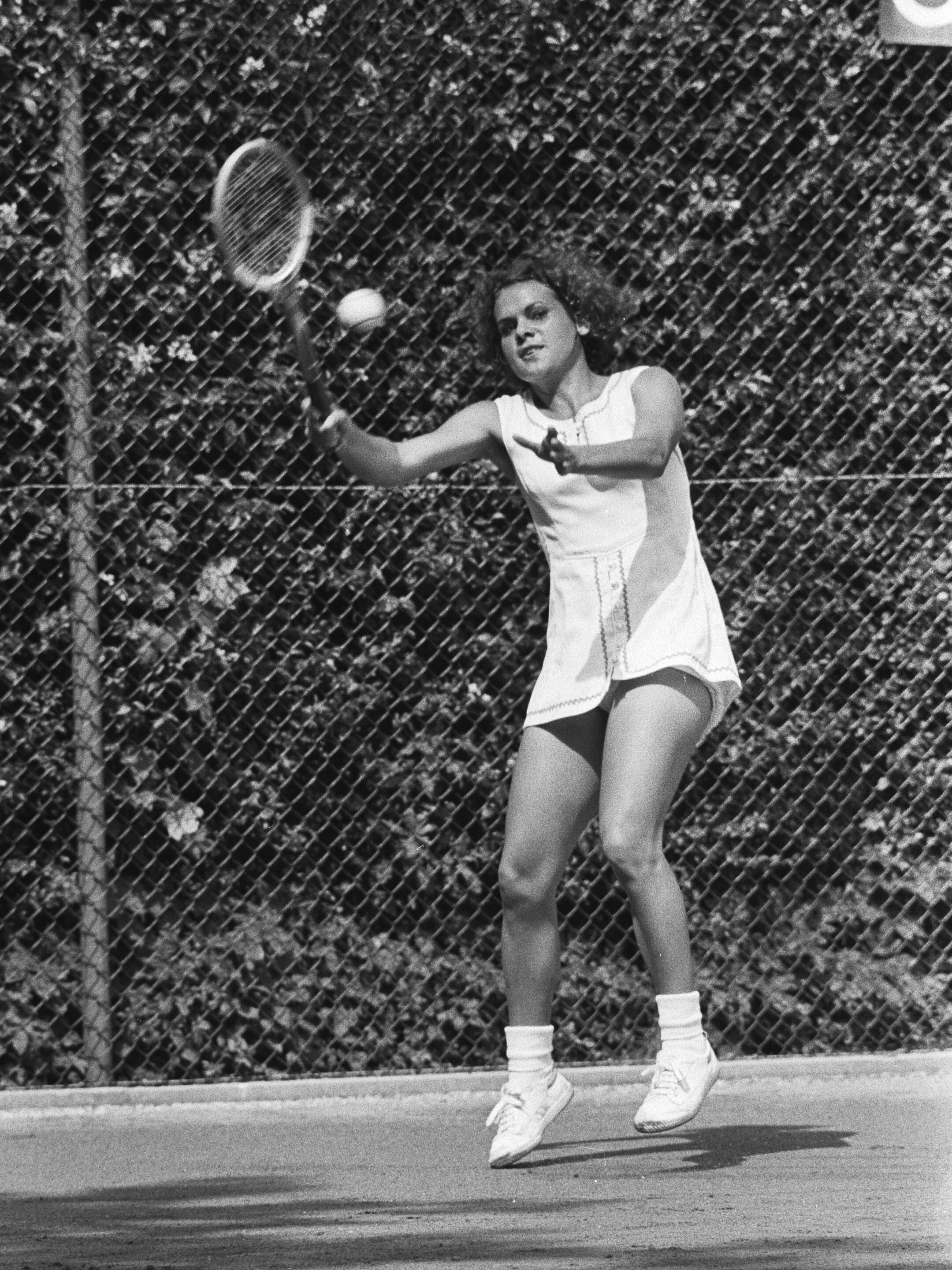
Australian tennis player Evonne Goolagong

The 1960s was a pivotal decade in the assertion of Aboriginal rights and a time of growing collaboration between Aboriginal activists and white Australian activists. In 1962, Commonwealth legislation guaranteed Aboriginal people the right to vote in Commonwealth elections, which had previously been denied to indigenous people in Queensland and Western Australia. A group of University of Sydney students organised a bus tour of western and coastal New South Wales towns in 1965 to raise awareness of the state of Aboriginal health and living conditions. This Freedom Ride also aimed to highlight the social discrimination faced by Aboriginal people and encourage Aboriginal people themselves to resist discrimination.

Indigenous Australians received lower wages than their non-indigenous counterparts in employment. Aboriginal and Torres Strait Islander people in Queensland in particular had their income quarantined by the Protector and were allowed a minimal amount of their income. In 1966, Vincent Lingiari led the famous Wave Hill walk-off (Gurindji strike) of Indigenous employees of Wave Hill Station in protest against poor pay and conditions (later the subject of the Paul Kelly and Kev Carmody song "From Little Things Big Things Grow"). Since 1999, the Queensland Government, under pressure from the Queensland Council of Unions, has established a number of schemes to give any earned income not received at the time back to indigenous Australians.

The landmark 1967 referendum called by Prime Minister Harold Holt allowed the Commonwealth to make laws with respect to Aboriginal people by modifying section 51(xxvi) of the Constitution, and for Aboriginal people to be included when the country does a count to determine electoral representation by repealing section 127. The referendum passed with 90.77% voter support.

In the controversial 1971 Gove land rights case, Justice Blackburn ruled that Australia had been terra nullius before British settlement, and that no concept of native title existed in Australian law. Following the 1973 Woodward commission, in 1975 the federal government under Gough Whitlam drafted the Aboriginal Land Rights Bill. This was enacted the following year under the Fraser government as the Aboriginal Land Rights (Northern Territory) Act 1976, which recognised Aboriginal Australians' system of land rights in the Northern Territory, and established the basis upon which Aboriginal people in the NT could claim rights to land based on traditional occupation.

In 1985, the Australian government returned ownership of Uluru (Ayers Rock) to the Pitjantjatjara Aboriginal people. In 1992, the High Court of Australia reversed Justice Blackburn's ruling and handed down its decision in the Mabo Case, declaring the previous legal concept of terra nullius to be invalid and confirming the existence of native title in Australia.

Indigenous Australians began to serve in parliaments from the late 1960s. In 1971, Neville Bonner joined the Australian Senate as a Senator for Queensland for the Liberal Party, becoming the first indigenous Australian in the Federal Parliament. A year later, the Aboriginal Tent Embassy was established on the steps of Parliament House in Canberra. In 1976, Sir Douglas Nicholls was appointed as the 28th Governor of South Australia, the first Aboriginal person appointed to vice-regal office. In the general election of 2010, Ken Wyatt of the Liberal Party became the first indigenous Australian elected to the Australian House of Representatives. In the general election of 2016, Linda Burney of the Australian Labor Party became the second indigenous Australian, and the first indigenous Australian woman, elected to the Australian House of Representatives. She was immediately appointed Shadow Minister for Human Services.

In sport Evonne Goolagong Cawley became the world number-one ranked tennis player in 1971 and won 14 Grand Slam titles during her career. In 1973 Arthur Beetson became the first indigenous Australian to captain his country in any sport when he first led the Australian National Rugby League team, the Kangaroos. In 1982, Mark Ella became captain of the Australia national rugby union team. In 2000, Aboriginal sprinter Cathy Freeman lit the Olympic flame at the opening ceremony of the 2000 Summer Olympics in Sydney, and went on to win the 400 metres at the Games. In 2019, tennis player Ashleigh Barty was ranked world number one.

In 1986, the Richters family, the last Aboriginal group to have still lived traditionally as hunter-gatherers, were located in the Great Victoria Desert. 2 years before, in 1984, the Pintupi Nine, who were also living traditionally, were tracked down in the Gibson Desert and brought in to a settlement.

During this period, the federal government enacted a number of significant, but controversial, policy initiatives in relation toiIndigenous Australians. A representative body, the Aboriginal and Torres Strait Islander Commission (ATSIC), was set up in 1990.

==== Reconciliation ====
Reconciliation between non-indigenous and indigenous Australians became a significant issue in Australian politics in the late 20th century. In 1991, the Council for Aboriginal Reconciliation was established by the federal government to facilitate reconciliation. In 1998, a Constitutional Convention which selected a Republican model for a referendum included just six indigenous participants, leading Monarchist delegate Neville Bonner to end his contribution to the convention with his Jagera tribal "Sorry Chant" in sadness at the low number of Indigenous representatives.

An inquiry into the Stolen Generations was launched in 1995 by the Keating government, and the final report delivered in 1997 – the Bringing Them Home report – estimated that around 10% to 33% of all Aboriginal children had been separated from their families for the duration of the policies. The succeeding Howard government largely ignored the recommendations provided by the report, one of which was a formal apology to Aboriginal Australians for the Stolen Generations.

The republican model, as well as a proposal for a new constitutional preamble which would have included the "honouring" of Aboriginal and Torres Strait Islander people, was put to referendum but did not succeed. In 1999, the Australian Parliament passed a Motion of Reconciliation drafted by Prime Minister John Howard in consultation with Aboriginal Senator Aden Ridgeway naming mistreatment of indigenous Australians as the most "blemished chapter in our national history", although Howard refused to offer any formal apology.

On 13 February 2008, Prime Minister Kevin Rudd issued a formal apology to Australia's Indigenous peoples, on behalf of the federal government of Australia, for the suffering caused by the Stolen Generations.

=== 21st century ===
In 2001, the Federal Government dedicated Reconciliation Place in Canberra. On 13 February 2008, Prime Minister Kevin Rudd reversed Howard's decision and issued a public apology to members of the Stolen Generations on behalf of the Australian Government.

ATSIC was abolished by the Australian Government in 2004 amidst allegations of corruption.

==== Emergency Response/Stronger Futures ====
The Northern Territory National Emergency Response (also known as the Intervention) was launched in 2007 by the government of Prime Minister John Howard, in response to the Little Children are Sacred report into allegations of child abuse among Aboriginal communities in the NT. The government banned alcohol in prescribed communities in the Territory; quarantined a percentage of welfare payments for essential goods purchasing; dispatched additional police and medical personnel to the region; and suspended the permit system for access to Aboriginal communities. In addition to these measures, the army were released into communities and there were increased police powers, which were later further increased with the so-called "paperless arrests" legislation.

In 2010, United Nations Special Rapporteur James Anaya found the Emergency Response to be racially discriminatory, and said that aspects of it represented a limitation on "individual autonomy". These findings were criticised by the government's Indigenous Affairs Minister Jenny Macklin, the Opposition and indigenous leaders like Warren Mundine and Bess Price.

In 2011, the Australian government enacted legislation to implement the Stronger Futures policy, which is intended to address key issues that exist within Aboriginal communities of the Northern Territory such as unemployment, school attendance and enrolment, alcohol abuse, community safety and child protection, food security and housing and land reforms. The policy has been criticised by organisations such as Amnesty International and other groups, including on the basis that it maintains "racially-discriminatory" elements of the Emergency Response Act and continues control by the federal government over "Aboriginal people and their lands".

==== Constitutional change proposed ====
In 2010, the federal government appointed a panel comprising indigenous leaders, other legal experts and some members of parliament (including Ken Wyatt) to provide advice on how best to recognise Aboriginal and Torres Strait Islander peoples in the federal Constitution. The panel's recommendations, reported to the federal government in January 2012, included deletion of provisions of the Constitution referencing race (Section 25 and Section 51(xxvi)), and new provisions on meaningful recognition and further protection from discrimination. (Note: For a discussion of the recommendations, see: Wood 2012, p. 156) Subsequently, a proposed referendum on Constitutional recognition of Indigenous Australians was abandoned in 2013.

The Uluru Statement from the Heart was released 26 May 2017 by delegates to an Aboriginal and Torres Strait Islander Referendum Convention, held near Uluru in Central Australia. The statement calls for a "First Nations Voice" in the Australian Constitution and a "Makarrata Commission" to supervise a process of "agreement-making" and "truth-telling" between government and Aboriginal and Torres Strait Islander peoples. The statement references the 1967 referendum which brought about changes to the Constitution to include indigenous Australians.

In 2023, the federal government held the Indigenous Voice referendum to recognise indigenous peoples in the constistution, and establish an advisory body to the government to represent indigenous interests. The proposal was rejected by Australian voters, having been opposed by the Liberal–National Coalition.

== Population ==
The Australian Bureau of Statistics estimates that in 2021 there were 983,700 Indigenous Australians, of whom 901,700 were Aboriginal, 39,540 Torres Strait Islander, and 39,540 identifying as both Aboriginal and Torres Strait Islander.

The Indigenous population from 1971 to 2021 are given below. These are based on initial census counts and have not been adjusted for undercounting and other factors.

Aboriginal and Torres Strait Islander population in Australia, 1971–2021
Census	Population	Percentage
1971	115,953	0.9%
1976	160,915	1.2%
1981	159,897	1.1%
1986	206,104	1.5%
1991	265,378	1.6%
1996	352,970	2.0%
2006	455,028	2.2%
2011	548,368	2.5%
2016	649,171	2.7%
2021	812,728	3.2%

=== Definition ===
Over time Australia has used various means to determine membership of ethnic groups such as lineage, blood quantum, birth and self-determination. From 1869 until well into the 1970s, children under 12 years of age with 25% or less Aboriginal blood were considered "white" and were often removed from their families by the Australian Federal and State government agencies and church missions, under acts of their respective parliaments in order that they would have "a reasonable chance of absorption into the white community to which they rightly belong". Grey areas in determination of ethnicity led to people of mixed ancestry being caught in the middle of divisive policies which often led to absurd situations:

In 1935, an Australian of part Indigenous descent left his home on a reserve to visit a nearby hotel where he was ejected for being Aboriginal. He returned home but was refused entry to the reserve because he was not Aboriginal. He attempted to remove his children from the reserve but was told he could not because they were Aboriginal. He then walked to the next town where he was arrested for being an Aboriginal vagrant and sent to the reserve there. During World War II he tried to enlist but was rejected because he was an Aborigine so he moved to another state where he enlisted as a non-Aborigine. After the end of the war he applied for a passport but was rejected as he was an Aborigine, he obtained an exemption under the Aborigines Protection Act but was now told he could no longer visit his relatives as he was not an Aborigine. He was later told he could not join the Returned Servicemens Club because he was an Aborigine.

In 1983 the High Court of Australia (in the Commonwealth v Tasmania or "Tasmanian dam(s) case") defined an Aboriginal or Torres Strait Islander as "a person of Aboriginal or Torres Strait Islander descent who identifies as an Aboriginal or Torres Strait Islander and is accepted as such by the community in which he or she lives". The ruling was a three-part definition comprising descent, self-identification and community identification. The first part – descent – was genetic descent and unambiguous, but led to cases where a lack of records to prove ancestry excluded some. Self- and community identification were more problematic as they meant that an Indigenous person separated from his or her community due to a family dispute could no longer identify as Aboriginal.

As a result, there arose court cases throughout the 1990s where excluded people demanded that their Aboriginality be recognised. As a result, lower courts refined the High Court test when subsequently applying it. In 1995, Justice Drummond in the Federal Court held in Gibbs v Capewell "...either genuine self-identification as Aboriginal alone or Aboriginal communal recognition as such by itself may suffice, according to the circumstances." This contributed to an increase of 31% in the number of people identifying as Indigenous Australians in the 1996 census when compared to the 1991 census. In 1998 Justice Merkel held in Shaw v Wolf that Aboriginal descent is "technical" rather than "real" – thereby eliminating a genetic requirement. This decision established that anyone can classify him or herself legally as an Aboriginal, provided he or she is accepted as such by his or her community.

=== Demographics ===
==== Inclusion in the national census ====
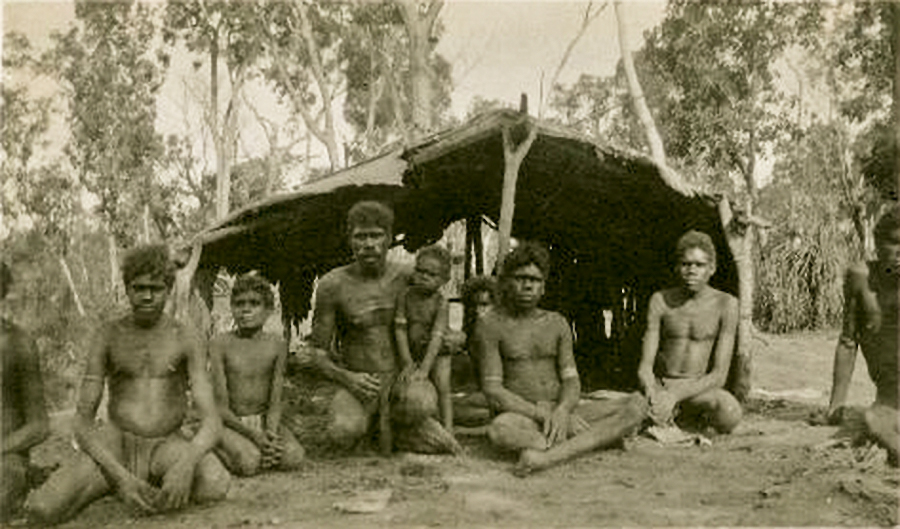
Aboriginal boys and men in front of a bush shelter, Groote Eylandt, c. 1933

Indigenous Australians have been counted in every census albeit only approximately and using inconsistent definitions. Section 127 of the Constitution, which was repealed in 1967, had excluded "aboriginal natives" from being counted in the overall population statistics for each state and territory and nationally with the Attorney-General providing a legal advice that a person was an "aboriginal native" if they were a "full-blood aboriginal". As a consequence of section 127, Indigenous Australians in remote areas uninhabited by non-Indigenous Australians were not counted prior to 1967 in censuses and sometimes estimated.

Post 1967, Torres Strait Islanders were considered a separate Indigenous people. Prior to 1947, Torres Strait Islanders were considered to be Aboriginal in censuses. In the 1947 census, Torres Strait Islanders were considered to be Polynesian and in the 1954 and 1961 censuses were considered to be Pacific Islanders. In the 1966 census, Torres Strait Islanders were considered to be Aboriginal.

A "Commonwealth working definition" for Indigenous Australians was developed from 1968 and endorsed by Cabinet in 1978 which contains elements of descent, self-identification and community recognition in contrast to the earlier preponderance of Aboriginal blood definition.

As there is no formal procedure for any community to record acceptance, the primary method of determining Indigenous population is from self-identification on census forms. The Australian Census includes counts based on questions relating to individuals' self-identification as Aboriginal, Torres Strait Islander, or of both origins. Owing to various difficulties which lead to under-counting, the Australian Bureau of Statistics (ABS) follows a set method to estimate total numbers.

==== Distribution and growth ====
The 2006 Australian census showed growth in the Indigenous population (recorded as 517,000) at twice the rate of overall population growth since 1996, when the Indigenous population stood at 283,000. In the 2011 census, there was a 20% rise in people who identify as Aboriginal. In the 2016 census, there was another 18.4% rise on the 2011 figure. 590,056 respondents identified themselves as Aboriginal, 32,345 Torres Strait Islander, and a further 26,767 both Aboriginal and Torres Strait Islanders. In the 2021 Australian census, 812,000 people identified as Aboriginal or Torres Strait Islander, representing 3.2% of the population. This was an increase from 2.8% in 2016 (i.e. about 25% increase), and 2.5% in 2011. However, the net undercount of Aboriginal and Torres Strait Islander people was 17.4%, and the estimated Indigenous population is around 952,000 to 1,000,000, or just under 4 per cent of the total population.

Growth to 2016 was mainly in major cities and along the eastern coast of Australia. In 2018 the ABS published a report exploring the reasons for these findings, with some of the factors behind the increase being higher fertility rates of Indigenous women; people entering the population through migration; variation in census coverage and response rates; and people changing how they self-identify between census years. Another factor might be the children of mixed marriages: the proportion of Aboriginal adults married (de facto or de jure) to non-Aboriginal spouses increased to 78.2% in the 2016 census, (up from 74% in 2011, 64% in 1996, 51% in 1991 and 46% in 1986); it was reported in 2002 that up to 88% of the offspring of mixed marriages subsequently self-identify as Indigenous Australians.

In the 2016, over 33% of the Indigenous population lived in major cities, compared with about 75% of the non-Indigenous population, with a further 24% in "inner regional" areas (compared with 18%), 20% in "outer regional" (8%), while nearly 18% lived in "remote" or "very remote" areas (2%). (Ten years earlier, 31% were living in major cities and 24% in remote areas.)

== Languages ==
As of 2021, 84% of Aboriginal and Torres Strait Islanders spoke only English at home. Nine percent spoke an Australian Indigenous language at home.

=== Aboriginal languages ===
Humans arrived in Australia 50,000 to 65,000 years ago but it is possible that the ancestor language of existing Indigenous languages is as recent as 12,000 years old. Over 250 Australian Aboriginal languages are thought to have existed at the time of first European contact. The National Indigenous Languages Survey (NILS) for 2018-19 found that more than 120 Indigenous language varieties were in use or being revived, although 70 of those in use are endangered. The 2021 census found that 167 Indigenous languages were spoken at home by 76,978 Indigenous Australians. NILS and the Australian Bureau of Statistics use different classifications for Indigenous Australian languages.

According to the 2021 census, the classifiable Aboriginal and Torres Strait Island languages with the most speakers are Yumplatok (Torres Strait Creole) (7,596 speakers), Kriol (7,403), Djambarrpuyngu (3,839), Pitjantjatjara (3,399), Warlpiri (2,592), Murrinh Patha (2,063) and Tiwi (2,053). There were also over 10,000 people who spoke an Indigenous language which could not be further defined or classified.

Several extinct Indigenous languages are being reconstructed. For example, the last fluent speaker of the Ngarrindjeri language died in the late 1960s; using recordings and written records as a guide, a Ngarrindjeri dictionary was published in 2009, and the Ngarrindjeri language is today spoken in complete sentences.

Aboriginal languages are divided into two main groups: the Pama–Nyungan languages which is spoken across about 90% of the continent, and the non-Pama–Nyungan. Recent research suggests that an ancestor language to all Aboriginal languages was spoken 12,000 years ago and spread across the continent in the past 6,000 years.

=== Torres Strait Island languages ===
Three languages are spoken on the islands of the Torres Strait, within Australian territory, by the Melanesian inhabitants of the area: Yumplatok (Torres Strait Creole) (7,596 speakers used the language at home in 2021), Kalaw Lagaw Ya (875 speakers) and Meriam Mir (256 speakers). Meriam Mir is a Papuan language, while Kalaw Lagaw Ya is an Australian language.

=== Creoles ===
A number of English-based creoles have arisen in Australia after European contact, of which Kriol and Yumplatok (Torres Strait Creole) are among the strongest and fastest-growing Indigenous languages. Kriol is spoken in the Northern Territory and Western Australia, and Torres Strait Creole in Queensland and south-west Papua. It is estimated that there are 20,000 to 30,000 speakers of Indigenous creole languages.

=== Tasmanian languages ===
Before British colonisation, there were perhaps five to sixteen languages on Tasmania, possibly related to one another in four language families. The last speaker of a traditional Tasmanian language, Fanny Cochrane Smith, died in 1905. Palawa kani is an in-progress constructed language, built from a composite of surviving words from various Tasmanian Aboriginal languages.

=== Indigenous sign languages ===
Traditional Indigenous languages often incorporated sign systems to aid communication with the hearing impaired, to complement verbal communication, and to replace verbal communication when the spoken language was forbidden for cultural reasons. Many of these sign systems are still in use.

=== Cross-cultural communications ===
Cross-cultural miscommunication can sometimes occur between Indigenous and non-Indigenous peoples. According to Michael Walsh and Ghil'ad Zuckermann, Western conversational interaction is typically "dyadic", between two particular people, where eye contact is important and the speaker controls the interaction; and "contained" in a relatively short, defined time frame. However, traditional Aboriginal conversational interaction is "communal", broadcast to many people, eye contact is not important, the listener controls the interaction; and "continuous", spread over a longer, indefinite time frame.

== Belief systems ==
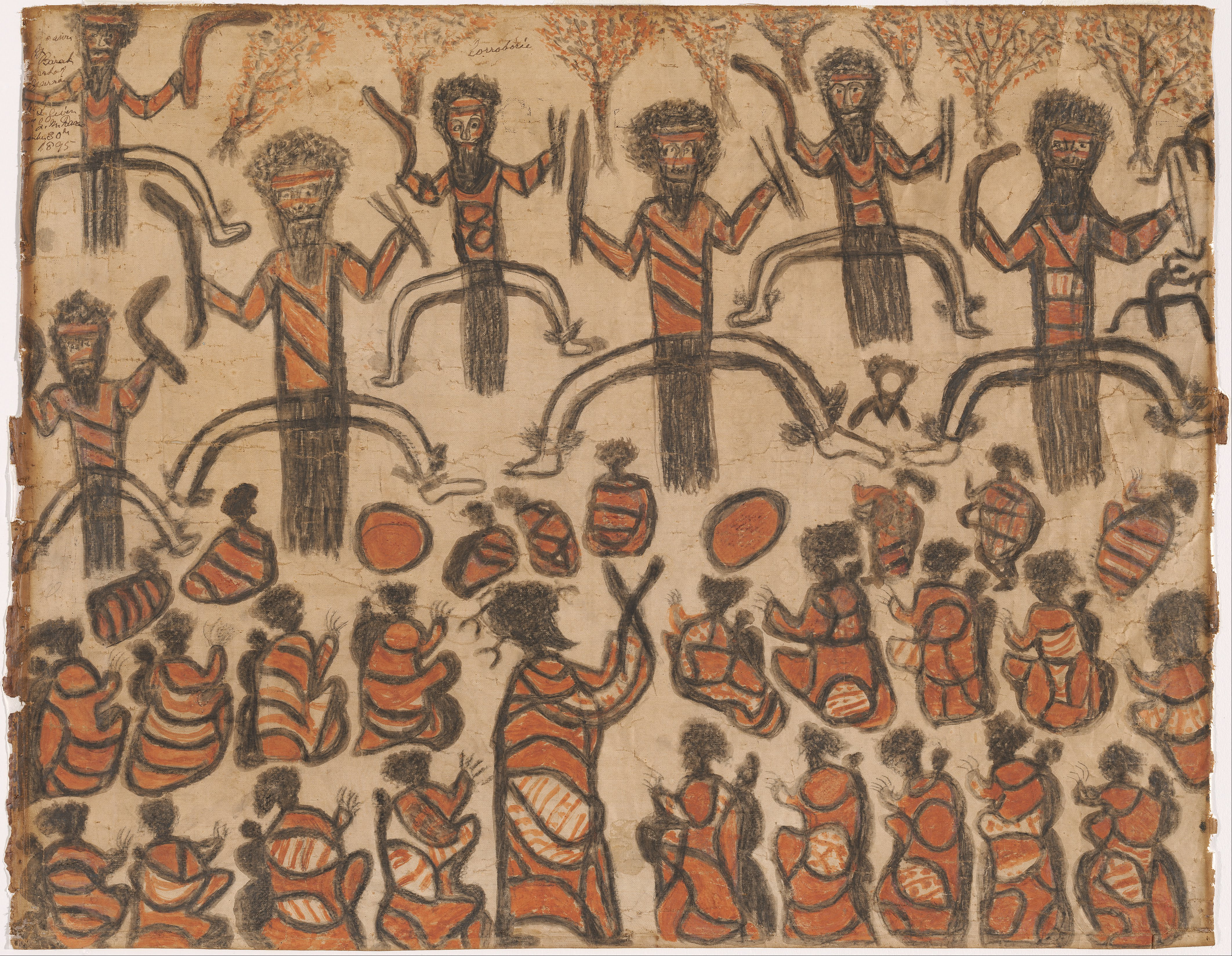
Depiction of a corroboree by 19th century Indigenous activist William Barak

=== Traditional beliefs ===
==== Aboriginal ====
In Aboriginal communities knowledge and decision making is shared between tribal elders. Travellers had to seek elder recognition and acknowledge local Elders – this is increasingly practiced in public events in Australia. Within Aboriginal belief systems, a formative epoch known as "the Dreaming" or "the Dreamtime" stretches back into the distant past when the creator ancestors known as the First Peoples travelled across the land, and naming as they went. Indigenous Australia's oral tradition and religious values are based upon reverence for the land and a belief in this Dreamtime. The Dreaming is at once both the ancient time of creation and the present-day reality of Dreaming. Different language and cultural groups each had their own belief structures; these cultures overlapped to a greater or lesser extent, and evolved over time. Major ancestral spirits include the Rainbow Serpent, Baiame, Dirawong and Bunjil. Knowledge contained in the Dreaming has been passed down through different stories, songlines, dances and ceremonies, and even today provides a framework for ongoing relationships, kinship responsibilities and looking after country.

Traditional healers (known as Ngangkari in the Western desert areas of Central Australia) were highly respected men and women who not only acted as healers or doctors, but were generally also custodians of important Dreaming stories.

==== Torres Strait Islander ====
Torres Strait Islander people have their own traditional belief systems. Stories of the Tagai represent Torres Strait Islanders as sea people, with a connection to the stars, as well as a system of order in which everything has its place in the world. Some Torres Strait Islander people share beliefs similar to the Aboriginal peoples' Dreaming and "Everywhen" concepts, passed down in oral history.

=== After colonisation ===
Christianity and European culture have had a significant impact on Indigenous Australians, their religion and their culture. As in many colonial situations, the churches both facilitated the loss of Indigenous culture and religion and also facilitated its maintenance. In some cases, such as at Hermannsburg, Northern Territory and Piltawodli in Adelaide, the work of missionaries laid the foundations for later language revival. The German missionaries Christian Teichelmann and Schürmann went to Adelaide and taught the local Kaurna people only in their own language and created textbooks in the language. However, some missionaries taught only in English, and some Christian missions were involved in the placement of Aboriginal and Torres Strait Islander children after they were removed from their parents upon orders of the government, and are therefore implicated in the Stolen Generations.

==== Aboriginal peoples ====
The involvement of Christians in Aboriginal affairs has evolved significantly since 1788. The Churches became involved in mission work among Aboriginal peoples in the 19th century as Europeans came to control much of the continent, and the majority of the population was eventually converted. Colonial clergy such as Sydney's first Catholic archbishop, John Bede Polding, strongly advocated for Aboriginal rights and dignity. Around the year 2000, many churches and church organisations officially apologised for past failures to adequately respect Indigenous cultures and address the injustices of the dispossession of Indigenous people.

A small minority of Aboriginal people are followers of Islam as a result of intermarriage with "Afghan" camel drivers brought to Australia in the late 19th and early 20th century to help explore and open up the interior.

==== Torres Strait Islander peoples ====
From the 1870s, Christianity spread throughout the Torres Strait Islands, and it remains strong today among Torres Strait Islander people everywhere. The London Missionary Society mission led by Rev. Samuel Macfarlane arrived on Erub (Darnley Island) on 1 July 1871, establishing its first base in the region there. The Islanders refer to this as "The Coming of the Light", or "Coming of Light" and all Island communities celebrate the occasion annually on 1 July. However the coming of Christianity did not spell the end of the people's traditional beliefs; their culture informed their understanding of the new religion, as God as preached in Christianity was welcomed and the new religion was integrated into every aspect of their everyday lives.

=== Recent census figures ===
In the 2016 Census, Australia's Indigenous and non-Indigenous population were broadly similar with 54% (vs 55%) reporting a Christian affiliation, while less than 2% reported traditional beliefs as their religion, and 36% reported no religion. The proportion of Indigenous people who reported no religion has increased gradually since 2001, standing at 36% in 2016. According to "Table 8: Religious Affiliation by Indigenous Status", 347,572 Indigenous people (out of the total 649,171 in Australia) declared an affiliation to some form of Christianity, with a higher proportion of Torres Strait Islander than Aboriginal people in this number. 7,773 reported traditional beliefs; 1,511 Islam; other religions numbered less than 1,000 each. However the question is optional; 48,670 did not respond, and in addition, nearly 4,000 were reported as "inadequately described". (Note: "[Include 'Religion' table download from this page, 'Table 8 Religious Affiliation by Indigenous Status, Count of persons(a)']" (ABS 2017.0 2017)) (In the 2006 census, 73% of the Indigenous population reported an affiliation with a Christian denomination, 24% reported no religious affiliation and 1% reported affiliation with an Australian Aboriginal traditional religion.)

== Culture ==
=== Art ===
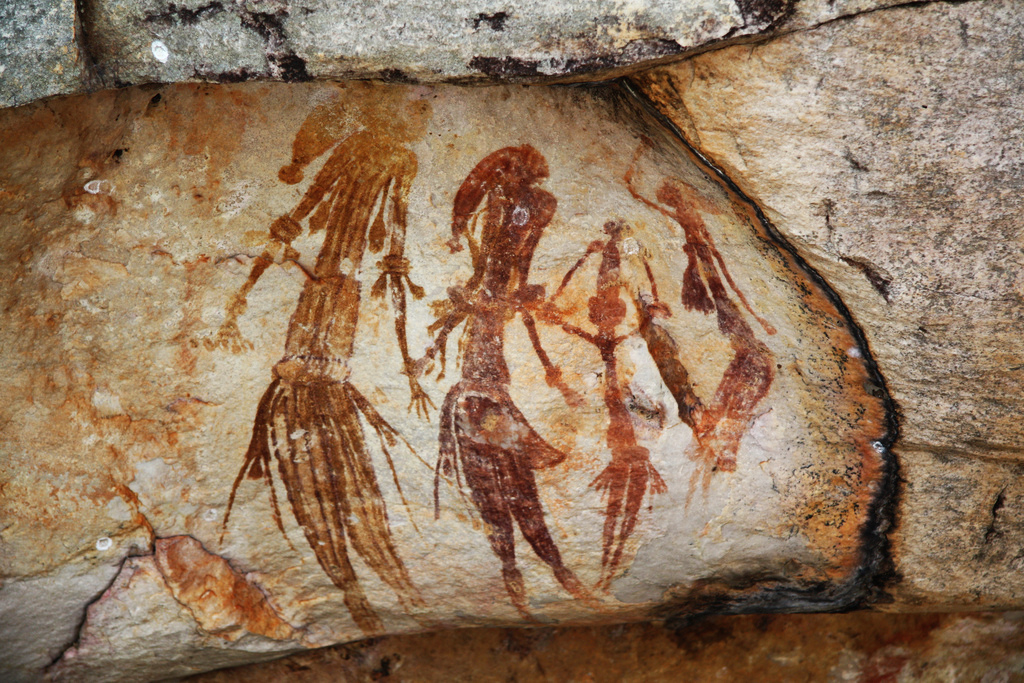
Gwion Gwion rock paintings in the Kimberley region of Western Australia

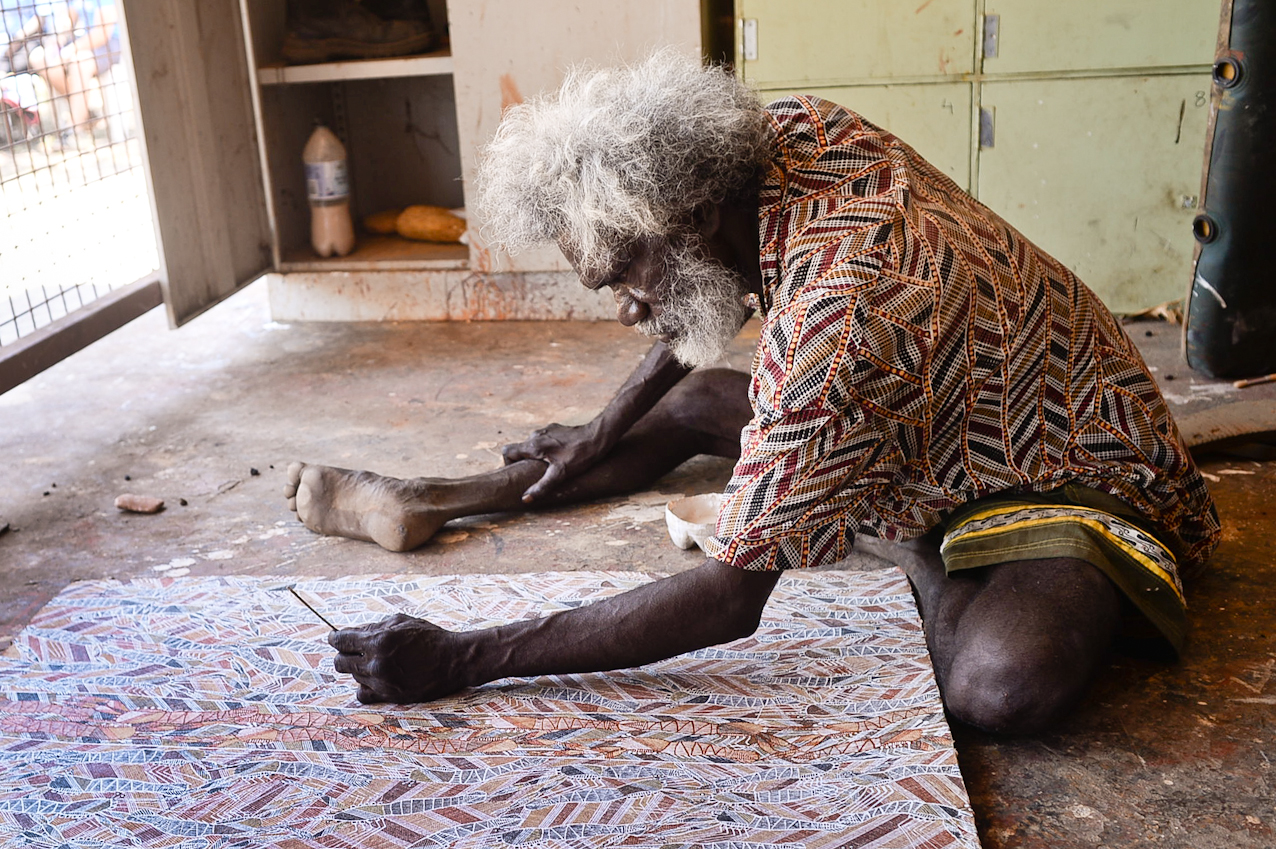
Arnhem Land artist Glen Namundja painting at Injalak Arts

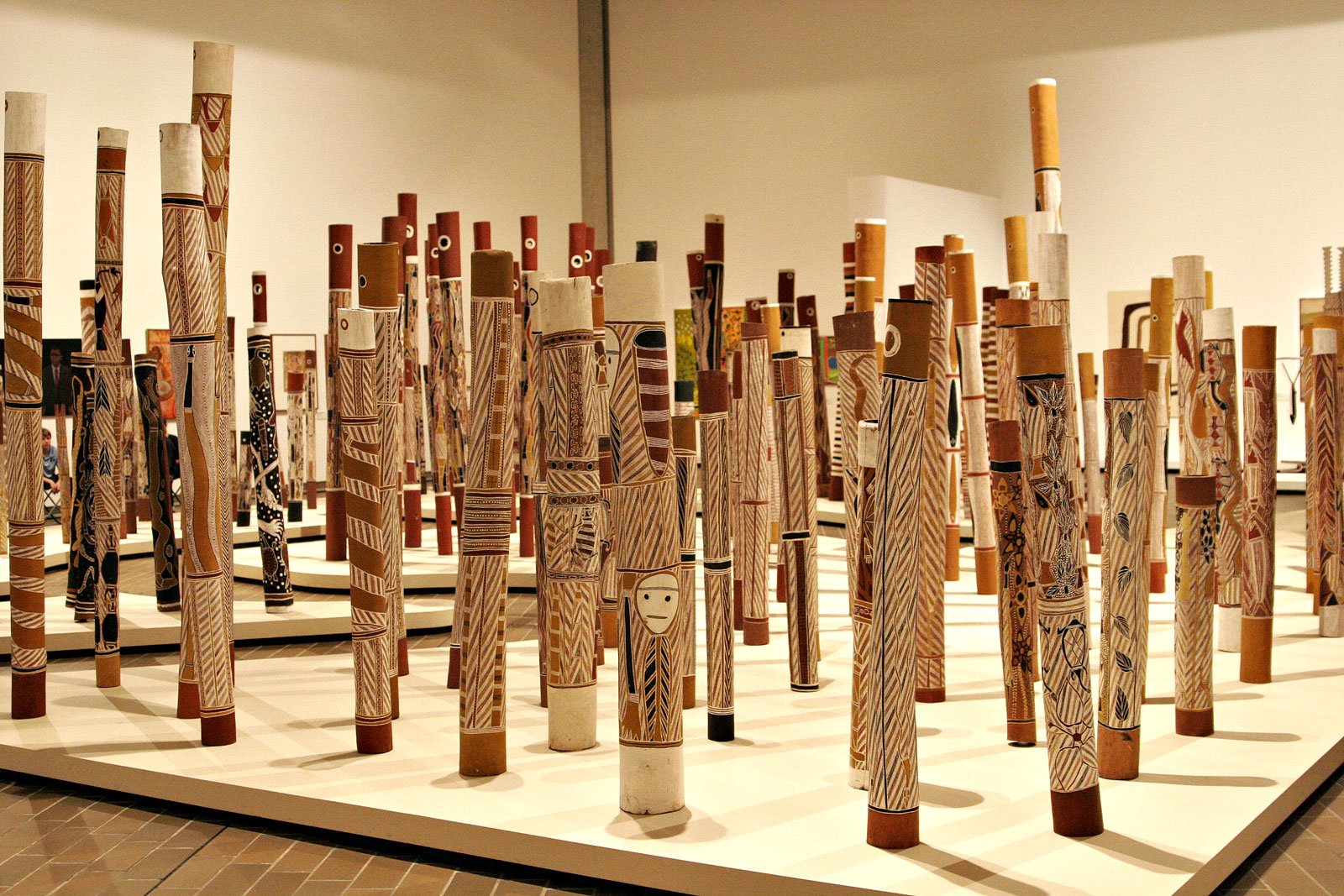
Aboriginal Memorial, National Gallery of Australia

Australia has a tradition of Aboriginal art which is thousands of years old, the best known forms being Australian rock art and bark painting. Evidence of Aboriginal art can be traced back at least 30,000 years, with examples of ancient rock art throughout the continent. Some of these are in national parks such as those of the UNESCO listed sites at Uluru and Kakadu National Park in the Northern Territory, but examples can also within protected parks in urban areas such as at Ku-ring-gai Chase National Park in Sydney. The Sydney rock engravings are between 5000 and 200 years old. Murujuga, in north-western Western Australia was heritage-listed in 2007 and inscribed as a World Heritage Site in July 2025.

In terms of age and abundance, cave art in Australia is comparable to that of Lascaux and Altamira (Upper Paleolithic sites in Europe), and Aboriginal art is believed to be the oldest continuing tradition of art in the world. There are three major regional styles: the geometric style found in Central Australia, Tasmania, the Kimberley and Victoria, known for its concentric circles, arcs and dots; the simple figurative style found in Queensland; and the complex figurative style found in Arnhem Land and the Kimberley. These designs generally carry significance linked to the spirituality of the Dreamtime. Paintings were usually created in earthy colours, from paint made from ochre. Such ochres were also used to paint their bodies for ceremonial purposes.

Several styles of Aboriginal art have developed in modern times, including the watercolour paintings of the Hermannsburg School and the acrylic Papunya Tula "dot art" movement. Some notable Aboriginal artists include William Barak (c. 1824–1903) and Albert Namatjira (1902–1959).

Since the 1970s, Indigenous artists have employed the use of acrylic paints – with styles such as that of the Western Desert Art Movement becoming globally renowned 20th-century art movements.

The National Gallery of Australia exhibits a great many Indigenous art works, including those of the Torres Strait Islands who are known for their traditional sculpture and headgear.

Aboriginal art has influenced many non-Indigenous artists, such as Margaret Preston (1875–1963) and Elizabeth Durack (1915–2000).

=== Music, dance and ceremony ===
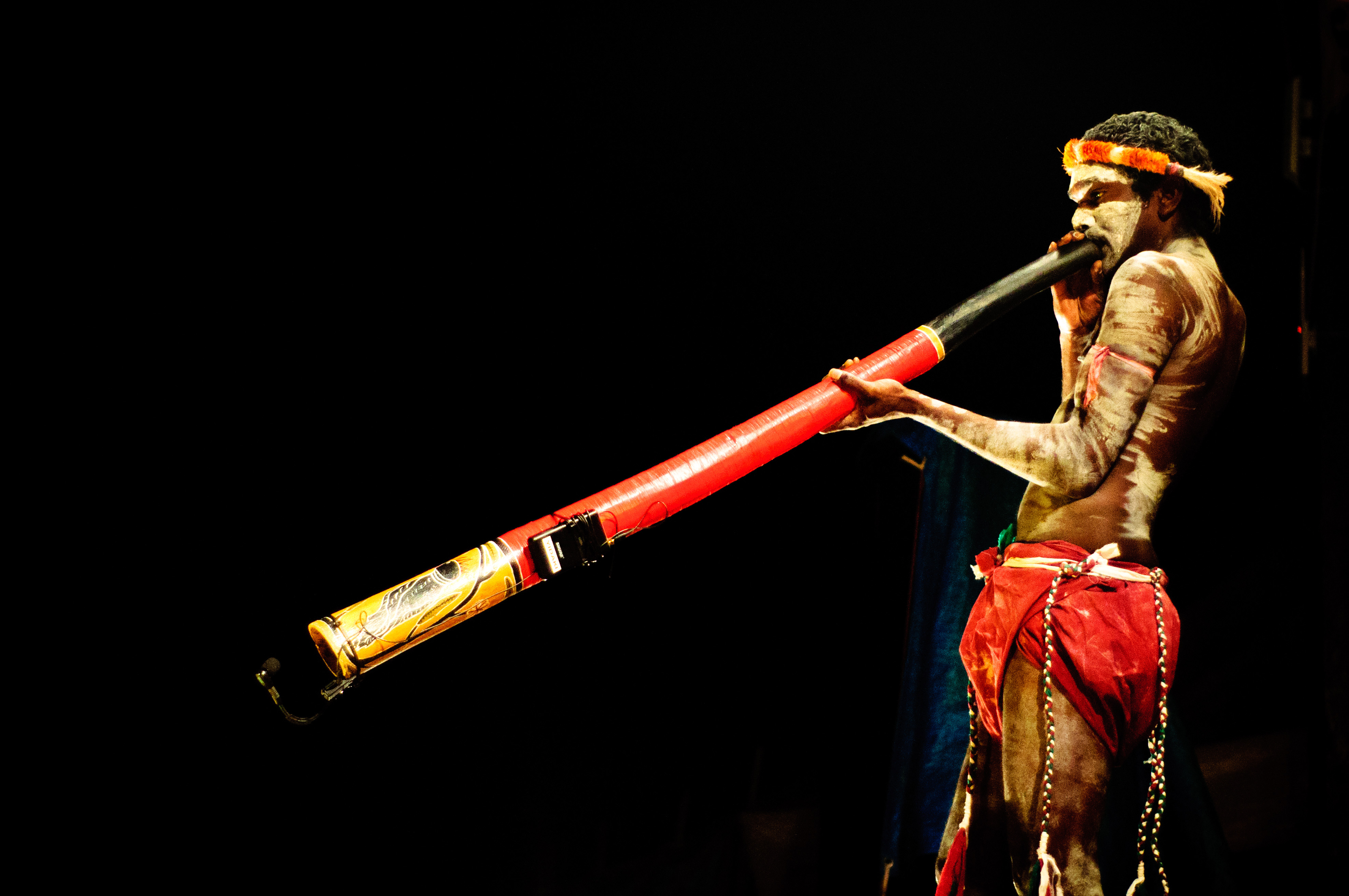
Didgeridoo player Ŋalkan Munuŋgurr performing with East Journey

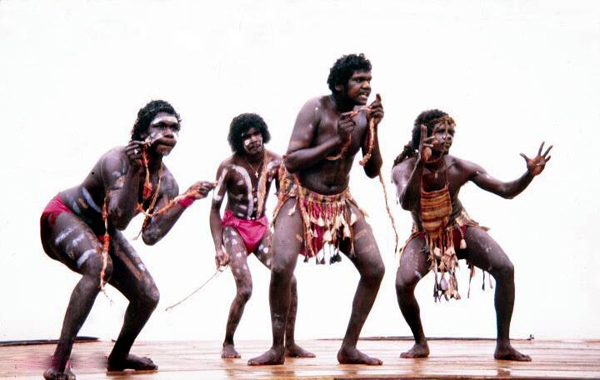
Aboriginal dancers in 1981

Music and dance have formed an integral part of the social, cultural and ceremonial observances of people through the millennia of the individual and collective histories of Australian Indigenous peoples to the present day. Around 1950, the first research into Aboriginal music was undertaken by the anthropologist A. P. Elkin, who recorded Aboriginal music in Arnhem Land.

The various Aboriginal peoples developed unique musical instruments and styles. The didgeridoo, which is widely thought to be a stereotypical instrument of Aboriginal people, was traditionally played by Aboriginal men of the eastern Kimberley region and Arnhem Land (such as the Yolngu). Bullroarers and clapsticks were used across Australia. Songlines relate to the Dreamtime in Aboriginal culture, overlapping with oral lore. Corroboree is a generic word to explain different genres of performance, embracing songs, dances, rallies and meetings of various kinds.

Indigenous musicians have been prominent in various contemporary styles of music, including creating a sub-genre of rock music as well as participating in pop and other mainstream styles. Hip hop music is helping preserve some Indigenous languages.

The Aboriginal Centre for the Performing Arts in Brisbane teaches acting, music and dance, and the Bangarra Dance Theatre is an acclaimed contemporary dance company.

For Torres Strait Islander people, singing and dancing is their "literature" – "the most important aspect of Torres Strait lifestyle. The Torres Strait Islanders preserve and present their oral history through songs and dances;... the dances act as illustrative material and, of course, the dancer himself is the storyteller" (Ephraim Bani, 1979).

=== Literature ===
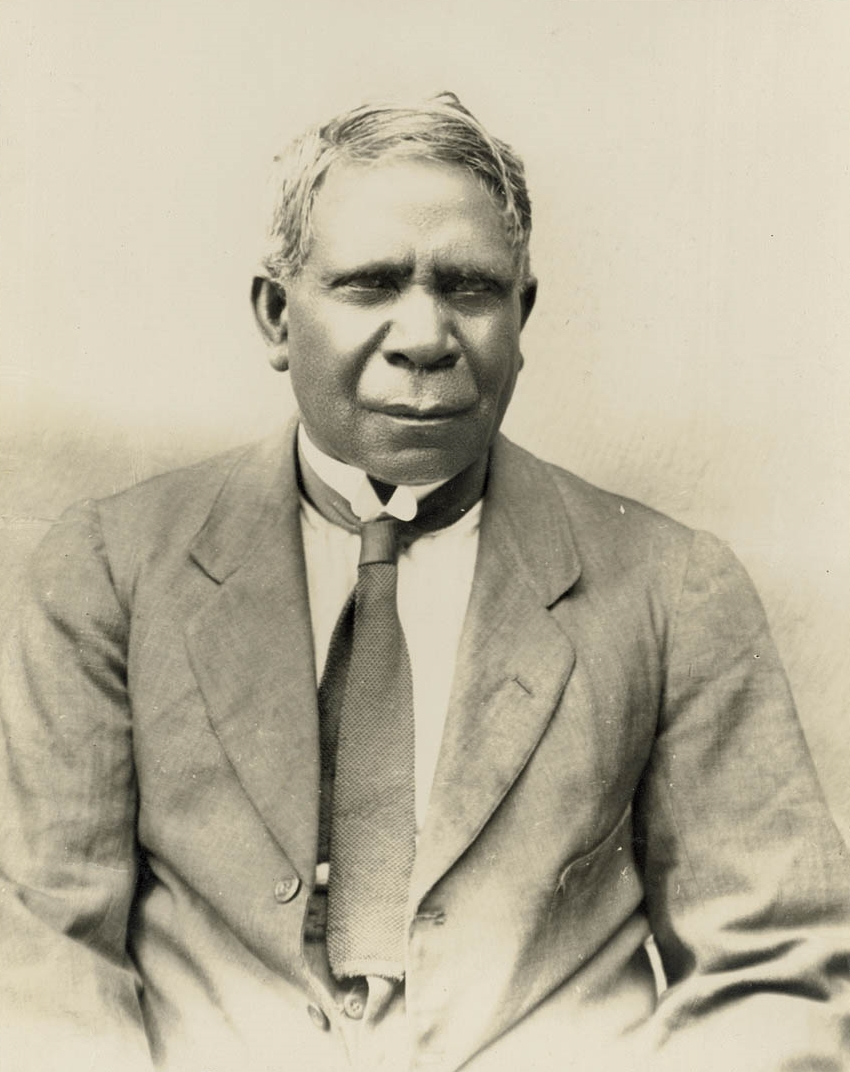
David Unaipon, the first Aboriginal published author

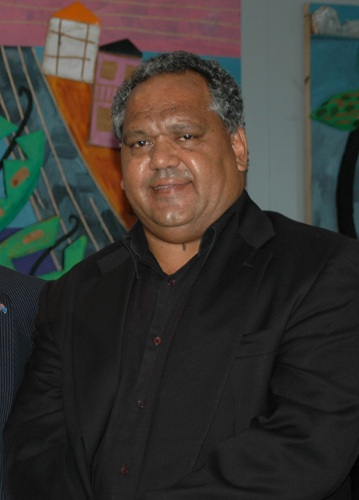
Aboriginal lawyer, activist and essayist Noel Pearson

There was no written form of the many languages spoken by Indigenous peoples before colonisation. A letter to Governor Arthur Phillip written by Bennelong in 1796 is the first known work written in English by an Aboriginal person. Before that, Indigenous societies were oral. Their cultural isolation for most of the last 65,000 years proved a perfect situation for the construction and preservation of some of the world's oldest stories. The historic Yirrkala bark petitions of 1963 are the first traditional Aboriginal documents recognised by the Australian Parliament.

In the 20th century, David Unaipon (1872–1967), known as the first Aboriginal author, is credited for providing the first accounts of Aboriginal mythology written by an Aboriginal person, in his Legendary Tales of the Aborigines (1924–1925). Oodgeroo Noonuccal (1920–1993) was a famous Aboriginal poet, writer and rights activist, credited with publishing the first book of verse by an Aboriginal author, We Are Going (1964). Sally Morgan's novel My Place (1987) was considered a breakthrough memoir in terms of bringing Indigenous stories to a wider audience. The talents of playwrights Jack Davis and Kevin Gilbert were recognised. Poetry by Indigenous poets, including traditional song-poetry – ranging from sacred to everyday – has been published since the late 20th century. (Note: Ronald M. Berndt has published traditional Aboriginal song-poetry in his book "Three Faces of Love", Nelson 1976. R. M. W. Dixon and M. Duwell have published two books dealing with sacred and everyday poetry: "The Honey Ant Men's Love Song" and "Little Eva at Moonlight Creek", University of Queensland Press, 1994.)

Writers coming to prominence in the 21st century include Alexis Wright; Kim Scott (twice winner of the Miles Franklin Award); Tara June Winch; Melissa Lucashenko; playwright and comedy writer Nakkiah Lui; in poetry Yvette Holt; and in popular fiction Anita Heiss. Leading activists Marcia Langton, who wrote First Australians (2008) and Noel Pearson (Up From the Mission, 2009) are as of 2020 active contemporary contributors to Australian literature. Journalist Stan Grant has written several non-fiction works on what it means to be Aboriginal in contemporary Australia, and Bruce Pascoe has written both fiction and non-fiction works. AustLit's BlackWords project provides a comprehensive listing of Aboriginal and Torres Strait Islander Writers and Storytellers. The Living Archive of Aboriginal Languages contains stories written in traditional languages of the Northern Territory.

=== Film and television ===
Australian cinema has a long history, and the ceremonies of Indigenous Australians were among the first subjects to be filmed in Australia – notably a film of Aboriginal dancers in Central Australia, shot by the anthropologist Baldwin Spencer and F. J. Gillen in 1900–1903.

Jedda (1955) was the first Australian feature film to be shot in colour film, the first to star Aboriginal actors in lead roles (Ngarla Kunoth and Robert Tudawali), and the first to be entered at the Cannes Film Festival. 1971's Walkabout was a British film set in Australia; it was a forerunner to many Australian films related to indigenous themes and introduced David Gulpilil to cinematic audiences. Chant of Jimmie Blacksmith (1976), directed by Fred Schepisi, was an award-winning historical drama from a book by Thomas Keneally, about the tragic story of an Aboriginal bushranger. Peter Weir's 1977 mystery drama The Last Wave, also starring Gulpilil and featuring elements of Aboriginal beliefs and culture, won several AACTA Awards.

The canon of films related to Indigenous Australians increased from the 1990s, with Nick Parson's film Dead Heart (1996) featuring Ernie Dingo and Bryan Brown; Rolf de Heer's The Tracker (2002), starring Gary Sweet and David Gulpilil; and Phillip Noyce's Rabbit-Proof Fence (2002).

The soundtrack of the 2006 film Ten Canoes directed by Rolf de Heer was filmed entirely in dialects of the Yolŋu Matha language group, with the main version featuring subtitles and English narration by David Gulpilil. The film won the Un Certain Regard Special Jury Prize at the 2006 Cannes Film Festival. The Straits, a 2012 drama series for TV based on an idea by Torres Strait Islander actor Aaron Fa'aoso, was partly filmed in the Torres Strait Islands and starred Fa'aoso and Jimi Bani (from Mabuiag Island), as well as Papua New Guinean actors. The documentary TV series Blue Water Empire (aired 2019), featuring Fa'aoso and Bani, tells the story of Torres Strait Islands from pre-colonial era up to contemporary times.

Many Indigenous actors, directors, producers and others have been involved in the production of film and TV series in the 21st century: Ivan Sen, Rachel Perkins (with her company Blackfella Films), Aaron Pedersen, Deborah Mailman, Warwick Thornton, Leah Purcell, Shari Sebbens, Sally Riley, Luke Carroll and Miranda Tapsell, Wayne Blair, and Trisha Morton-Thomas, among others, with many of them well-represented in award nominations and wins. The films Sweet Country (2017), Top End Wedding (2019) and TV series Cleverman and Total Control (2019), all made by Aboriginal film-makers and featuring Aboriginal themes, were well-received and in some cases won awards.

The third series of the sketch comedy TV series Black Comedy, co-written by Nakkiah Lui, Adam Briggs, Steven Oliver and others, and featuring many Indigenous actors, began to air in January 2020.

== Recreation and sport ==
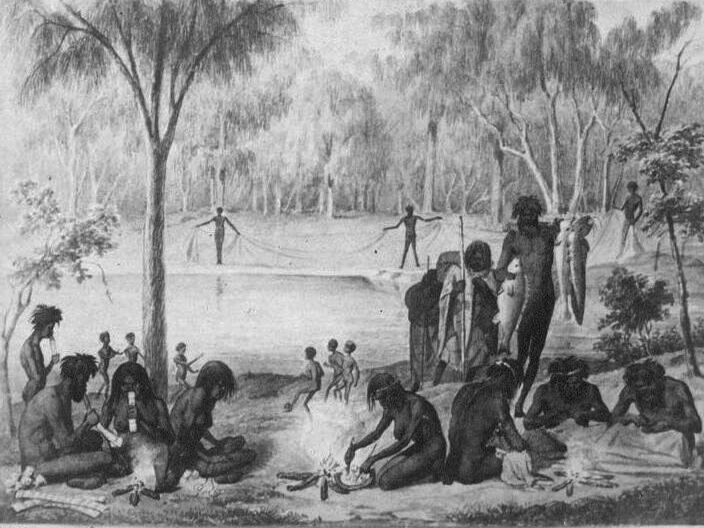
1857 depiction of the Jarijari (Nyeri Nyeri) at Mondellimin engaged in recreational activities, including a type of Aboriginal football from the Blandowski expedition

Though lost to history, many traditional forms of recreation were played and while these varied from tribe to tribe, there were often similarities. Ball games were quite popular and played by tribes across Australia, as were games based on use of weapons. There is extensive documented evidence of traditional football games being played. Perhaps the most documented is a game popularly played by tribes in western Victorian regions of the Wimmera, Mallee and Millewa by the Djab wurrung, Jardwadjali and Jarijari people. Known as Marn Grook, it was a type of kick and catch football game played with a ball made of possum hide. According to some accounts, it was played as far away as the Yarra Valley by the Wurundjeri people, Gippsland by the Gunai people, and the Riverina in south-western New South Wales. Some historians claim that Marn Grook had a role in the formation of Australian rules football, and many Aboriginal people, from children in remote communities to professional players at the highest level, the Australian Football League, play the modern game. Well-known players include Graham Farmer, Gavin Wanganeen, Adam Goodes and Lance Franklin. Goodes was also the Australian of the Year for 2014.

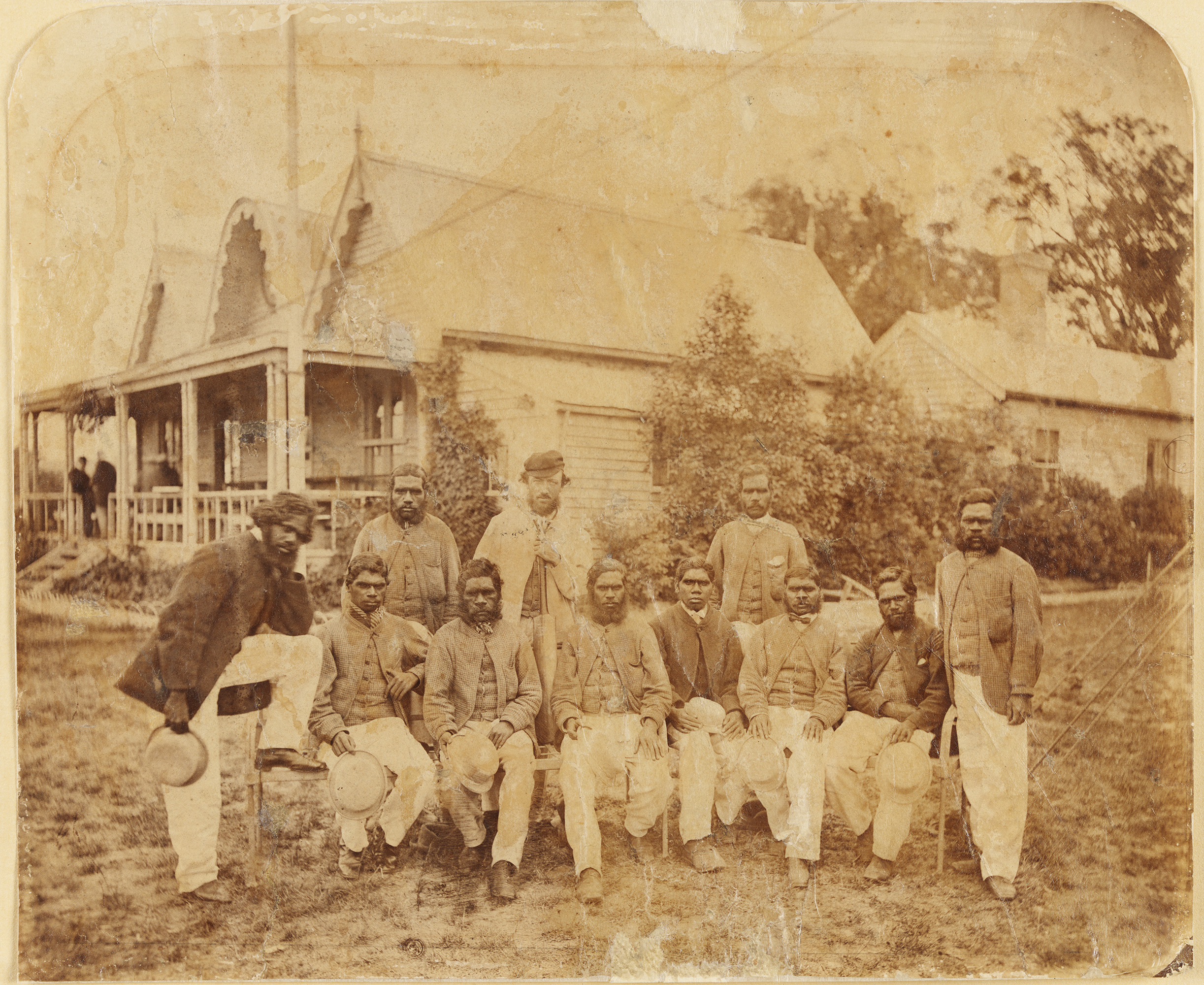
Aboriginal cricket team with Tom Wills (coach and captain), Melbourne Cricket Ground, December 1866

A team of Aboriginal cricketers from the Western District of Victoria toured England in 1868, making it the first Australian sports team to travel overseas. Cricketer and Australian rules football pioneer Tom Wills coached the team in an Aboriginal language he learnt as a child, and Charles Lawrence accompanied them to England. Johnny Mullagh, the team's star player, was regarded as one of the era's finest batsmen.

Evonne Goolagong became the world number-one ranked female tennis player, with 14 major tennis titles. Ashleigh Barty, inspired by Goolagong, also reached number-one and won three major singles titles. Sprinter Cathy Freeman earned gold medals in the Olympics, World Championships, and Commonwealth Games. Lionel Rose earned a world title in boxing. Arthur Beetson, Laurie Daley and Gorden Tallis captained Australia in rugby league, while Mark Ella captained Australia in rugby union. Nathan Jawai and Patty Mills have played in the National Basketball Association.

Sporting teams include the Indigenous All-Stars, Flying Boomerangs and Indigenous Team of the Century in Australian rules football, and the Indigenous All Stars, NSW Koori Knockout and the Murri Rugby League Team in rugby league.

== Contemporary issues ==
=== Closing the Gap ===
To this day, the forced removal of children known as the Stolen Generations has had a huge impact on the psyche, health and well-being of Indigenous Australians; it has seriously impacted not only the children removed and their parents, but their descendants as well. Not only were many of the children abused – psychologically, physically, or sexually – after being removed and while living in group homes or adoptive families, but were also deprived of their culture alongside their families. This has resulted in the disruption of oral culture, as parents were unable to communicate their knowledge to their children, and thus much has been lost.

There are many issues facing Indigenous people in Australia today when compared with the non-Indigenous population, despite some improvements. Several of these are interrelated, and include health (including shorter life expectancy and higher rates of infant mortality), lower levels of education and employment, inter-generational trauma, high imprisonment rates, substance abuse and lack of political representation.

Some demographic facts are related to these issues, as cause or result:

- In the 2016 Australian Census, over 33% of the Indigenous population lived in major cities, compared with about 75% of the non-Indigenous population, with a further 24% in "inner regional" areas (compared with 18%), 20% in "outer regional" (8%), while nearly 18% lived in "remote" or "very remote" areas (2%).
- The Indigenous population of Australia is much younger than the non-Indigenous population, with an estimated median age of 21 years (37 years for non-Indigenous), due to higher rates of birth and death. For this reason, age standardisation is often used when comparing Indigenous and non-Indigenous statistics.

The federal government's Closing the Gap strategy, created in 2008 and coordinated by the National Indigenous Australians Agency since July 2019, aims to address multiple areas to improve the lives of Indigenous peoples. Draft targets for 2019 were created by the Council of Australian Governments (COAG) in December 2018. These were in the following areas:

- families, children and youth
- health
- education
- economic development
- housing
- justice (including youth justice)
- land and water, "where Aboriginal and Torres Strait Islander peoples' land, water and cultural rights are realised"
- cross-system priorities, which "addresses racism, discrimination and social inclusion, healing and trauma, and the promotion of culture and language for Aboriginal and Torres Strait Islander peoples"

=== Health ===
Social and cultural determinants such as discrimination, lack of education or employment (and therefore income), and cultural disconnection can impact both physical and mental health, and contemporary disadvantage is related to colonisation and its ongoing impact.

Successive censuses have shown, that (after adjusting for demographic structures) Indigenous Australians experience greater rates of renal disease, several communicable diseases (such as tuberculosis and hepatitis C virus), type 2 diabetes, respiratory disease, poor mental health and other illnesses than the general population.

==== Life expectancy ====
The life expectancy of Indigenous Australians is difficult to quantify accurately. Indigenous deaths are poorly identified, and the official figures for the size of the population at risk include large adjustment factors. Two estimates of Indigenous life expectancy in 2008 differed by as much as five years. The ABS introduced a new method in 2009, but problems remained. A 2013 study, referring to the national Indigenous reform policy, Closing the Gap, looked at the difficulties in interpreting the extent of the gap because of differing methods of estimating life expectancy between 2007 and 2012. (Note: "A specific estimate of the life expectancy gap has not been established among stakeholders in Indigenous health. Agreement on the magnitude of the gap is arguably needed in order to evaluate strategies aimed at improving health outcomes for Indigenous Australians. Moreover, measuring progress towards 'closing the gap' depends on the availability of comparable estimates, using the same techniques of measurement to assess changes over time." (Rosenstock et al. 2013:356–64)) The 2019 report by the Close the Gap campaign reported that the gap in life expectancy was "widening rather than closing". Life expectancy for Aboriginals and Torres Strait islanders was 71.6 for men and 75.6 for women as of 2016–2017.

Infant mortality (ages 0–4) was twice as high as for non-Indigenous children in 2014–2016.

==== Mental health ====
Mental health, suicide and self-harm remain major concerns, with the suicide rate being double that of the non-Indigenous population in 2015, and young people experiencing rising rates of mental health difficulties. There are high incidences of anxiety, depression, PTSD and suicide amongst the Stolen Generations, with this resulting in unstable parenting and family situations.

==== Substance abuse ====
Many Indigenous communities suffer from a range of health, social and legal problems associated with substance abuse of both legal and illegal drugs, including but not limited to alcohol abuse, petrol sniffing, the use of illegal drugs such as methamphetamine, cannabis, and smoking tobacco. Tobacco use has been estimated to be the "greatest contributor (23%) to the gap in the disease burden between Indigenous and non-Indigenous Australians", with Indigenous people 2.5 times more likely to smoke daily than non-Indigenous Australians.

Indigenous Australians were 1.6 times more likely to abstain completely from alcohol than non-Indigenous people in 2012–2013. Foetal alcohol syndrome has been a problem, but the rate of pregnant women drinking had halved between 2008 and 2015 (from 20% to 10%).

Petrol sniffing has been a problem among some remote communities. A 2018 longitudinal study by the University of Queensland (UQ), commissioned by the National Indigenous Australians Agency, (Note: On 1 July 2019 the Indigenous Affairs portfolio was moved through a Machinery of Government change to form the National Indigenous Australians Agency (NIAA).) reported that the number of people sniffing petrol in the 25 communities studied had declined by 95.2%, from 453 to just 22, related to the distribution of a new, low aromatic petrol, Opal, in NT in 2005.

The 2018 UQ study also reported that alcohol and cannabis were the drugs causing most concern. Ice was reported present in 8 of the 25 communities, but nearly all only occasional use.

=== Education ===
There is a significant gap between Indigenous and non-Indigenous people in educational attainment. This presents significant issues for employment. As of 2018, Indigenous students or adults, when compared with non-Indigenous peers:

- Have a lower school attendance rate, with these rates at 82% and 93% respectively (in remote areas, as low as 63%)
- Have lower literacy and numeracy, although rates had improved significantly on some NAPLAN (standardised school testing) measures
- Reach Year 12 at a lower rate, with improvement from 59% to 74% between 2006 and 2016, with the gap at 24% in 2016
- Are underrepresented in higher education and have lower completion rates

Closing the Gap has focused on improving education for Indigenous people, with some success. Attainment of Year 12 or equivalent for ages 20–24 has increased from 47.4% in 2006 to 65.3% in 2016. This has led to more Indigenous people undertaking higher or vocational education courses. According to the Closing the Gap report, Indigenous students in higher education award courses more than doubled in number over the decade from 2006 (9,329) to 2017 (19,237).

However, most of the Closing the Gap targets for education are not on track. In general, the gaps have improved (such as in NAPLAN results) or not devolved (school attendance rate remaining stable for several years) have not met targets. Remoteness seems to be a factor; students in isolated or remote communities do not perform or attend as well as students in urban areas. The Closing the Gap Report 2019 reported that of the seven targets, only two – early childhood education and Year 12 attainment – had been met. Only Year 9 numeracy was on track in all states and territories, with variations among them.

The Aboriginal Centre for the Performing Arts was established as a training centre by the state and federal governments in 1997.

=== Employment ===
Compared to the national average, Indigenous people experience high unemployment and poverty rates. As of the 2018 Closing the Gap Report, the Indigenous employment rate had decreased from 48% to 46.6% between 2006 and 2016, while the non-Indigenous employment rate remained steady at around 72% (a 25.4% gap). The employment rate for Indigenous women, however, increased from 39% to 44.8% in the same period.

The Racial Discrimination Act was introduced in 1975, and the Anti-Discrimination Act, in 1977. Legal action alone cannot prevent all forms of racism, however, these Acts were put into law to place checks on the system.

A 2016 ABS report on labour force characteristics show low employment rates. An analysis of the figures suggested significant barriers to Indigenous people gaining employment, possibly including job location, employer discrimination, and lack of education and others. A big factor is education. Those with a degree had an employment probability of 85% (for males) and 74% (for females) for gaining employment, decreasing along with qualifications, so that those who have completed Year 9 and below have a 43% (male) and 32% (female) probability of gaining employment. Other factors, unlike education, are not covered by government policy, such as discrimination and unfair treatment. Employed Indigenous Australians were more likely to experience discrimination than those who are unemployed, and it has been found that the second most common source of unfair treatment (after members of the public) is at work or applying for work. There was also a significant lack of consultation with Indigenous peoples on the methods they think best to tackle issues like unemployment.

=== Crime ===
Indigenous Australians are over-represented in Australia's criminal justice system. As of September 2019, Aboriginal and Torres Strait Islander prisoners represented 28% of the total adult prisoner population, while accounting for 3.3% of the general population. In May 2018, Indigenous women made up 34% of all women imprisoned in Australia. A 2017–2018 report into youth justice undertaken by the Australian Institute of Health and Welfare reported that about half (a total of 2,339) of the young people aged 10–17 under supervision in 2016–2017 were Indigenous, although of that age group, Indigenous youth represent 5% of the general population. It concludes from the data that there is a clear issue occurring not only within Australia's criminal justice system, but within communities as a whole.

Explanations given for this over-representation include the economic position of Indigenous Australians, the knock-on effects of the stolen generations and disconnection from land, the effects of their health and housing situations, their ability to access an economic base such as land and employment, their education, and the use of alcohol and other drugs.

Indigenous Australians are also over-represented as victims of crime, in particular, assault. Indigenous women are highly over-represented in this figure, accounting for a higher proportion of assault victims than the non-Indigenous category.

In 2007, the Northern Territory Government commissioned a Board of Inquiry into the Protection of Aboriginal Children from Sexual Abuse, which produced a report known as the Little Children are Sacred report. This suggested, based largely on anecdotal evidence, that children in remote Aboriginal communities in NT were suffering from widespread sexual abuse. The Australian Human Rights Commission's Social Justice Report 2008 said that the 2005–2006 ABS statistics did not appear to support the "allegations of endemic child abuse... that was the rationale for the NTER" ("The Intervention" by the Howard government) that followed.

=== Family violence ===
The rate of family violence in Indigenous Australian communities, especially in the Northern Territory, has been high for many years, and under-reported. It has been estimated to be around 34 times greater than the national rate, and, in the worst areas, up to 80 times. There is no single cause for this high rate, but several probable causes or aggravating factors have been suggested by various researchers and stakeholders, including: dispossession of land and subsequent displacement of communities; childhood abuse experienced by the Stolen Generations, along with intergenerational trauma; economic disadvantage; violent family environments; poor health; inadequate housing; racism; loss of Aboriginal identity; and many others. An AIHW survey covering eight years to 2019, published in December 2021, revealed that Aboriginal and Torres Strait Islander people accounted for 28 per cent of all hospitalisations due to family violence, despite only making up 3.3% of the total population. Various reasons were suggested by experts, including Aboriginal men's control of decision-making, and limited independence for women owing to economic factors; barriers in access to services; racism by some police and other services; and lack of enough Aboriginal-run organisations providing culturally safe services.

As the federal government, upon being urged by experts to create the means to halt the violence in 2021, announced an extra A$10.7 million "to boost frontline services in the Northern Territory... and to work towards our Closing the Gap commitments", in addition to other funding already committed to the states and NT under the National Partnership on Family, Domestic and Sexual Violence Responses.

== Efforts towards recognition and reparations ==
In 2021, Australia's government, led by Prime Minister Scott Morrison, announced the creation of a reparations fund for members of the Stolen Generations—Indigenous Australians who were forcibly removed from their homes as children. This policy of forced assimilation, which continued into the 1970s, has had lasting impacts on Indigenous communities. The reparations fund includes one-off payments of 75,000 Australian dollars to victims, as part of a broader initiative to address the serious disadvantages faced by Australia's Indigenous population.

In addition, there's an emerging solidarity between Black and Indigenous communities for finding land justice and reparations. Initiatives like the Indigenous-led Land Back movement and various Black community organizations are working towards reclaiming land and advocating for financial restitution for civil and human rights violations. These movements utilize cooperative structures to advance land justice, emphasizing the importance of communal wealth and regenerative systems that are not extractive of people or the planet.

== Political issues ==
=== Timeline ===
Since the 20th century there have been a number of individuals and organisations who have instigated significant events in the struggle for political representation, land rights and other political issues affecting the lives of Indigenous Australians:

- 1937: Yorta Yorta man William Cooper collects 1800 signatures to petition King George VI for representation of the original occupants of Australia in federal Parliament.
- 26 January (Australia Day) 1938: The Aborigines Progressive Association holds a Day of Mourning, to protest 150 years of callous treatment and the seizure of land.

=== Political representation ===
Under Section 41 of the Australian Constitution, Aboriginal Australians always had the legal right to vote in Australian Commonwealth elections if their State granted them that right. This meant that all Aboriginal peoples outside Queensland and Western Australia had a legal right to vote. The right of Indigenous ex-servicemen to vote was affirmed in 1949 and all Indigenous Australians gained the unqualified right to vote in Federal elections in 1962. Unlike other Australians, however, voting was not made compulsory for Indigenous people, and it was not until the repeal of Section 127 of the Constitution of Australia following the 1967 referendum that Indigenous Australians were counted in the population for the purposes of distribution of electoral seats.

As of January 2020, six Indigenous Australians have been elected to the Australian Senate: Neville Bonner (Liberal, 1971–1983), Aden Ridgeway (Democrat, 1999–2005), Nova Peris (Labor, 2013–2016), Jacqui Lambie (2014–2017, 2019–incumbent), Pat Dodson (Labor, 2016–incumbent), and former Northern Territory MLA Malarndirri McCarthy (Labor, 2016–incumbent).

Following the 2010 Australian Federal Election, Ken Wyatt of the Liberal Party won the Western Australian seat of Hasluck, becoming the first Indigenous person elected to the Australian House of Representatives. His nephew, Ben Wyatt, was concurrently serving as Shadow Treasurer in the Western Australian Parliament and in 2011 considered a challenge for the Labor Party leadership in that state. Linda Burney became the second Indigenous person, and the first woman, to serve in the federal House of Representatives.

In March 2013, Adam Giles of the Country Liberal Party (CLP) became Chief Minister of the Northern Territory – the first Indigenous Australian to become head of government in a state or territory of Australia. Hyacinth Tungutalum, also of the CLP, was the first Indigenous person elected to any Australian (state or territory) parliament. A Tiwi man from Bathurst Island, he was elected to the Northern Territory Legislative Assembly in October 1974 as the member for Tiwi.

A number of Indigenous people represent electorates at state and territory level, and South Australia has had an Aboriginal Governor, Sir Douglas Nicholls. The first Indigenous Australian to serve as a minister in any government was Ernie Bridge, who entered the Western Australian Parliament in 1980. Carol Martin was the first Aboriginal woman elected to a State parliament in Australia (the Western Australian Legislative Assembly) in 2001, and the first woman minister was Marion Scrymgour, who was appointed to the Northern Territory ministry in 2002 (she became Deputy Chief Minister in 2008). Representation in the Northern Territory has been relatively high, reflecting the high proportion of Aboriginal voters. The 2012 Territory election saw large swings to the conservative CLP in remote Territory electorates, and a total of five Aboriginal CLP candidates won election to the Assembly, along with one Labor candidate, in a chamber of 25 members. Among those elected for the CLP were high-profile activists Bess Price and Alison Anderson.

Forty people identifying as being of Indigenous Australian ancestry have been members of the ten Australian legislatures. Of these, 22 have been in the Northern Territory Legislative Assembly. The Northern Territory has an exceptionally high Indigenous proportion (about one third) of its population. Adam Giles, who was Chief Minister of the Northern Territory from 2013 to 2016, was the first Indigenous head of government in Australia. In 1974, the year of its creation, the Northern Territory Legislative Assembly was also the first Australian parliament to have an Indigenous member elected to it.

The 2022 election featured the largest number of Indigenous candidates in Australian history, with four running for the Coalition, eleven for Labor, and seventeen for the Greens. The Greens Victorian senate ticket were all Aboriginal.

As of 2023, Indigenous Australians members of the senate represent 10.5% of the 76 Senate seats, and 1.9% in the House. The total representation is at 4.8%, far above the national population of 3.3%.

=== Federal government initiatives ===
The Aboriginal and Torres Strait Islander Commission (ATSIC) was set up as a representative body in 1990 under the Hawke government. In 2004, the Howard government disbanded ATSIC and replaced it and the Aboriginal and Torres Strait Islander Services (ATSIS) Regional and State Offices with an appointed network of Indigenous Coordination Centres (ICC) that administer Shared Responsibility Agreements and Regional Partnership Agreements with Aboriginal communities at a local level. ICCs operate as whole-of-government centres, housing staff from a number of departments to deliver services to Indigenous Australians.

Major political parties in Australia have tried to increase Indigenous representation within their parties. One suggestion for achieving this is to introduce seat quotas, as in the Maori electorates in New Zealand.

In October 2007, just before the calling of a federal election, the then Prime Minister, John Howard, revisited the idea of bringing a referendum to seek recognition of Indigenous Australians in the Constitution (his government having previously sought to include recognition of Indigenous peoples in the Preamble to the Constitution in the 1999 Australian republic referendum). His announcement was seen by some as a surprising adoption of the importance of the symbolic aspects of the reconciliation process, and reaction was mixed. The Australian Labor Party initially supported the idea; however Kevin Rudd withdrew this support just before the election, earning a rebuke from activist Noel Pearson.

The Gillard government (2010–2013), with bi-partisan support, convened an Expert Panel to consider changes to the Australian Constitution that would see recognition for Indigenous Australians, who delivered their report, which included five recommendations for changes to the Constitution as well as recommendations for the referendum process, in January 2012. The Government promised to hold a referendum on the constitutional recognition of Indigenous Australians on or before the federal election due for 2013. The plan was abandoned in September 2012, with Minister Jenny Macklin citing insufficient community awareness for the decision.

In December 2015, the 16-member Aboriginal and Torres Strait Islander Referendum Council was jointly appointed by the Prime Minister, Malcolm Turnbull, and Leader of the Opposition, Bill Shorten. After six months of consultation, the First Nations National Constitutional Convention met over four days from 23 to 26 May 2017, and ratified the Uluru Statement from the Heart by a standing ovation from the gathering of 250 Indigenous leaders. The Statement calls for a "First Nations Voice" in the Australian Constitution and a "Makarrata Commission" (Makarrata is a Yolngu word "describing a process of conflict resolution, peacemaking and justice").

==== 2019: Indigenous voice to government ====
In May 2019, Prime Minister Scott Morrison created the position of Minister for Indigenous Australians, a Cabinet portfolio in the Second Morrison Ministry, with Ken Wyatt as the inaugural officebearer. On 30 October 2019, Wyatt announced the commencement of a "co-design process" aimed at providing an Indigenous voice to Parliament. The Senior Advisory Group is co-chaired by Professor Tom Calma AO, Chancellor of the University of Canberra, and Professor Dr Marcia Langton, Associate Provost at the University of Melbourne, and comprises a total of 20 leaders and experts from across the country. The first meeting of the group was held in Canberra on 13 November 2019.

=== Native title, sovereignty and treaties ===
About 22% of land in Northern Australia (Kimberley, Top End and Cape York) is now Aboriginal-owned. In the last decade, nearly 200 native title claims covering 1.3 million km^{2} of land – approximately 18% of the Australian continent – have been approved.

In 1992, in Mabo v Queensland, the High Court of Australia recognised native title in Australia for the first time. The majority in the High Court rejected the doctrine of terra nullius, in favour of the concept of native title.

In 2013, an Indigenous group describing itself as the Murrawarri Republic declared independence from Australia, claiming territory straddling the border between the states of New South Wales and Queensland. Australia's Attorney General's Department indicated it did not consider the declaration to have any meaning in law.

In 2014, another Indigenous group describing itself as the Sovereign Yidindji Government declared independence from Australia.

Unlike in other parts of the former British Empire, like the Treaty of Waitangi in New Zealand, no treaty has ever been concluded between Indigenous Australians and an Australian government. However, although there is still no move toward a treaty at federal level, it is contended that the Noongar Settlement (South West Native Title Settlement) in Western Australia in 2016 constitutes a treaty, and at the state and territory levels there are currently (early 2018) other negotiations and preparatory legislation. In South Australia, however, following the 2018 state election negotiations have been "paused". In June 2018, the Parliament of Victoria passed a bill to advance the process of establishing a treaty with Aboriginal Victorians. The Victorian First Peoples' Assembly was elected in November 2019 and sat for the first time on 10 December 2019.

== Prominent Indigenous Australians ==
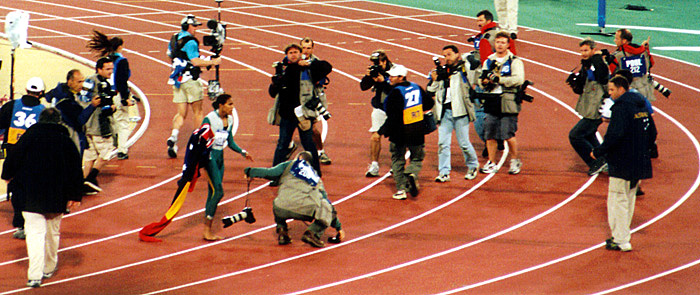
Cathy Freeman surrounded by world media and carrying the Aboriginal and Australian flags following her victory in the 400 m final of the Sydney Olympics, 2000

ABC footage and interviews of Australians celebrating Freeman's Olympics win – many noting how it brought the country together "as one"

After the arrival of European settlers in New South Wales, some Indigenous Australians became translators and go-betweens; the best-known was Bennelong, who eventually adopted European dress and customs and travelled to England where he was reportedly presented to King George III. Others, such as Pemulwuy, Yagan, and Windradyne, became famous for armed resistance to the European settlers.

During the twentieth century, as social attitudes shifted and interest in Indigenous culture increased, there were more opportunities for Indigenous Australians to gain recognition. Albert Namatjira became a painter, and actors such as David Gulpilil, Ernie Dingo, and Deborah Mailman became well known. Bands such as Yothu Yindi, and singers Christine Anu, Jessica Mauboy and Geoffrey Gurrumul Yunupingu, have combined Indigenous musical styles and instruments with pop/rock, gaining appreciation amongst non-Indigenous audiences. Polymath David Unaipon is commemorated on the Australian $50 note.

While relatively few Indigenous Australians have been elected to political office (Neville Bonner, Aden Ridgeway, Ken Wyatt, Nova Peris, Jacqui Lambie and Linda Burney remain the only Indigenous Australians to have been elected to the Australian Federal Parliament), Aboriginal rights campaigner Sir Douglas Nicholls was appointed Governor of the State of South Australia in 1976, and many others have become famous through political activism – for instance, Charles Perkins' involvement in the Freedom Ride of 1965 and subsequent work; or Torres Strait Islander Eddie Mabo's part in the landmark native title decision that bears his name. The voices of Cape York activists Noel Pearson and Jean Little, and academics Marcia Langton and Mick Dodson, today loom large in national debates. Some Indigenous people who initially became famous in other spheres – for instance, poet Oodgeroo Noonuccal – have used their celebrity to draw attention to Indigenous issues.

In health services, Kelvin Kong became the first Indigenous surgeon in 2006 and is an advocate of Indigenous health issues.

== See also ==
- Aboriginal deaths in custody
- Aboriginal sites of New South Wales
- Animal Management in Rural and Remote Indigenous Communities
- Australian Aboriginal sacred sites
- Australian Indigenous HealthInfoNet
- Australian Institute of Aboriginal and Torres Strait Islander Studies
- Australian outback literature of the 20th century
- Australo-Melanesian
- Customary law in Australia
- Domestic violence in Australia § Indigenous family violence
- Indigenous Protected Area
- IndigenousX, media platform
- List of Indigenous Australian firsts
- List of Indigenous Australian historical figures
- List of laws concerning Indigenous Australians
- NAIDOC Week
- Repatriation and reburial of human remains
- Slavery in Australia
- Welcome to Country

== Sources ==
- "$10.7 million boost for domestic violence services in the NT". Department of Social Services Ministers. 28 February 2022. Archived from the original on 17 May 2022.
- "1301.0 – Year Book Australia, 2002". Australian Bureau of Statistics. 25 January 2002.
- "1301.0 – Year Book Australia, 2005". Australian Bureau of Statistics. 21 January 2005a.
- "1370.0 – Measures of Australia's Progress, 2004". Australian Bureau of Statistics. 21 April 2004b.
- "2020 Summiteer Dr Kelvin Kong". Life Matters. Australia: ABC. 3 March 2008. Archived from the original on 20 March 2008.
- "2021 Census – Cultural Diversity, 2021, TableBuilder". Australian Bureau of Statistics. 2021.
- "2021 Census overcount and undercount, 2021". Australian Bureau of Statistics. 10 August 2021.
- "2071.0 – Census of Population and Housing: Reflecting Australia – Stories from the Census, 2016: Religion in Australia, 2016". Australian Bureau of Statistics. 28 June 2017.
- "2077.0 – Census of Population and Housing: Understanding the Increase in Aboriginal and Torres Strait Islander Counts, 2006–2011". Australian Bureau of Statistics. 17 September 2013.
- "2077.0 – Census of Population and Housing: Understanding the Increase in Aboriginal and Torres Strait Islander Counts, 2016: Changing Propensity to Identify". Australian National Census. Australian Bureau of Statistics. 17 October 2018.
- "2077.0 – Census of Population and Housing: Understanding the Increase in Aboriginal and Torres Strait Islander Counts, 2016: Summary of Key Findings". Australian Bureau of Statistics. 17 October 2018.
- "3238.0.55.001 – Estimates of Aboriginal and Torres Strait Islander Australians, June 2016". Australian Bureau of Statistics. 18 September 2018.
- "3238.0.55.001 – Estimates of Aboriginal and Torres Strait Islander Australians, June 2016: Technical Note 1 Estimated Resident Aboriginal and Torres Strait Islander Population – Method of Calculation". Australian Bureau of Statistics. 31 August 2018.
- "3302.0.55.003 – Experimental Life Tables for Aboriginal and Torres Strait Islander Australians, 2005–2007". Australian Bureau of Statistics. 25 May 2009.
- "36. Kinship and Identity: Legal definitions of Aboriginality". Australian Law Reform Commission. 28 July 2010. Archived from the original on 28 February 2019.
- "4. Administration: Coordination and engagement at regional and national levels". Australian Government, Office of Indigenous Policy Coordination. 2006. Archived from the original on 20 February 2008.
- "4102.0 – Australian Social Trends, 2005: Crime and Justice: Aboriginal and Torres Strait Islander People: Contact with the Law ABS". Australian Bureau of Statistics. 12 July 2005b. Archived from the original on 21 May 2010.
- "4510.0 – Recorded Crime – Victims, Australia, 2016". Australian Bureau of Statistics. 6 July 2017.
- "4512.0 – Corrective Services, Australia, September Quarter 2019: Key Statistics". Australian Bureau of Statistics. 28 November 2019.
- "4517.0 – Prisoners in Australia, 2009: Imprisonment rates". Australian Bureau of Statistics. 10 December 2010b. Archived from the original on 19 February 2011.
- "4704.0 – the Health and Welfare of Australia's Aboriginal and Torres Strait Islander Peoples, 2008". Australian Bureau of Statistics. 2008.
- "4713.0 – Population Characteristics, Aboriginal and Torres Strait Islander Australians, 2006, Religion". Australian Bureau of Statistics. 4 May 2010a.
- "4714.0 – National Aboriginal and Torres Strait Islander Social Survey, 2014–15: Labour Force Characteristics". Australian Bureau of Statistics. 28 April 2016.
- "8 interesting facts about Aboriginal and Torres Strait Islanders". World Vision Australia.
- "Aboriginal and Torres Strait Islander people: Census". Australian Bureau of Statistics. 28 June 2022.
- "Aboriginal and Torres Strait Islander peoples". Style Manual. Australian Government. 6 September 2021.
- "Aboriginal and Torres Strait Islander population". Australian Bureau of Statistics. 2004a.
- "Aboriginal Art Online, Traditional painting methods". Aboriginal Art Online. 2008. Archived from the original on 22 April 2011.
- Aboriginal Australia & the Torres Strait Islands: Guide to Indigenous Australia. Lonely Planet Publications. 2001. ISBN 978-1-86450-114-8 – via Internet Archive.
- "Aboriginal culture celebrated at 2015 Saltwater Freshwater Festival in Coffs Harbour". ABC News. 26 January 2015.
- "Aboriginal culture one of world's oldest". Australian Geographic. 23 September 2011. Archived from the original on 30 November 2011.
- "Aboriginal Heritage walk: Ku-ring-gai Chase National Park". NSW National Parks and Wildlife Service.
- "Aboriginal Land Rights (Northern Territory) Act 1976 (Cth)". Documenting A Democracy. Museum of Australian Democracy.PDF of original version
- "Aboriginal or not: More Australians than ever are identifying as Indigenous". Special Broadcasting Service. 7 August 2012. Archived from the original on 1 July 2014.
- "Aboriginal Stewardship Models Brought to Canada". Pew Environment Group. 24 October 2012. Archived from the original on 13 January 2014.
- "Aboriginal, Indigenous or First Nations?". Common Ground. Archived from the original on 6 February 2021.
- "Aborigine". Merriam-Webster.com Dictionary. Merriam-Webster. 27 February 2024.
- "Aborigine stitches up role as surgeon". The Sydney Morning Herald. 5 January 2003.
- "Aborigines Protection Act". National Museum Australia. 30 June 2021.
- "Aborigines want remains returned". The Canberra Times. Vol. 62, no. 19, 109. 30 January 1988. p. 4 – via Trove.
- "About". Stand for Freedom. 2012. Archived from the original on 13 April 2012.
- "About + Contact". Blak & Bright. n.d. Archived from the original on 3 October 2020.
- "A Century of Population Change in Australia". Australian Bureau of Statistics. 2001.
- "About Living Black". NITV. 29 June 2015.
- "About the reparations scheme". Government of Queensland. Archived from the original on 24 November 2016.
- Adcock, G. J.; Dennis, E. S.; Easteal, S.; Huttley, G. A.; Jermiin, L. S.; Peacock, W. J.; Thorne, A. (16 January 2001). "Mitochondrial DNA sequences in ancient Australians: Implications for modern human origins". Proceedings of the National Academy of Sciences. 98 (2): 537–542. Bibcode:2001PNAS...98..537A. doi:10.1073/pnas.98.2.537. ISSN 0027-8424. PMC 14622. PMID 11209053.
- Aghakhanian, Farhang; Yunus, Yushima; Naidu, Rakesh; Jinam, Timothy; Manica, Andrea; Hoh, Boon Peng; Phipps, Maude E. (May 2015). "Unravelling the Genetic History of Negritos and Indigenous Populations of Southeast Asia". Genome Biology and Evolution. 7 (5): 1206–1215. doi:10.1093/gbe/evv065. PMC 4453060. PMID 25877615.
- AIATSIS; FATSIL (2005). National Indigenous Languages Survey Report 2005 (PDF) (Report). AIATSIS in association with the Federation of Aboriginal and Torres Strait Islander Languages (FATSIL). ISBN 0-642753-229. Archived from the original (PDF) on 6 March 2020.
- Allmon, Ben; Kelly, David (5 May 2018). "The Saltwater People – a picture essay". The Guardian. "The journey of the Saltwater people of the Gold Coast as documented by photographer David Kelly and narrated by Ben Allmon"
- Amery, Rob (n.d.). "Piltawodli Native Location (1838–1845)". German missionaries in Australia. Griffith University.
- Anaya, James (February 2010). "United Nations Special Rapporteur on the situation of human rights and fundamental freedoms of indigenous people, James Anaya: Observations on the Northern Territory Emergency Response in Australia" (PDF). un.org.au. Archived from the original (PDF) on 20 April 2013.
- Andrews, M. (2004). The Seven Sisters. North Melbourne: Spinifex Press. p. 424. ISBN 978-1-876756-45-1.
- "Appeal for Justice: Dhakiyarr Wirrpanda". National Archives of Australia. 20 October 2004. Archived from the original on 5 May 2010.
- "Appropriate Terminology, Indigenous Australian Peoples" (PDF). General Information Folio 5. Flinders University – via ipswich.gld.gov.au.
- Arcioni, Elisa (1 September 2012). "Excluding Indigenous Australians from 'The People': A Reconsideration of Sections 25 and 127 of the Constitution". Federal Law Review. 40 (3). Canberra: 287–315. doi:10.22145/flr.40.3.1. ISSN 1444-6928. S2CID 210774854.
- "Arthur Beetson OAM" (PDF). The K Faktor. Archived from the original (PDF) on 20 January 2012.
- "Australia: Aboriginal and Torres Strait Islander population summary". Australian Bureau of Statistics. 1 July 2022. Text may have been copied from this source, which is available under a Attribution 4.0 International (CC BY 4.0) licence. (See here.
- "Australian Aboriginal cultures". Tourism Australia. 16 June 2020.
- Australian Electoral Commission (12 November 2020). "Electoral milestones for Indigenous Australians". Australian Electoral Commission. Authorised by the Electoral Commissioner: Canberra ACT 2600.
- "The Australian Eleven: The first Australian team". National Museum of Australia. 25 July 2010. Archived from the original on 14 December 2011.
- "Australian Indigenous art". Australian Government Culture Portal. 21 December 2007. Archived from the original on 16 April 2010.
- "Australian Indigenous tools and technology". australia.gov.au. 20 April 2016. Archived from the original on 29 January 2017.
- "Australians Together | The Stolen Generations". Australians Together.
- "Australia's Megafauna Coexisted with Humans". ScienceDaily. University of Sydney. 31 May 2005.
- Bach, J. (1966). "Dampier, William (1651–1715)". Australian Dictionary of Biography. Vol. 1. National Centre of Biography, Australian National University.
- Ballyn, Sue (2011). "The British Invasion of Australia. Convicts: Exile and Dislocation" (PDF). University of Barcelona.
- Biddle, Nicholas; Hunter, Boyd; Yap, Mandy; Gray, Matthew. "Eight ways we can improve Indigenous employment". The Conversation.
- Bird, Dylan (6 April 2011). "Aboriginal identity goes beyond skin colour". The Sydney Morning Herald.
- Bird, M. I.; Turney, C. S. M.; Fifield, L. K.; Jones, R.; Ayliffe, L. K.; Palmer, A.; Cresswell, R.; Robertson, S. (2002). "Radiocarbon analysis of the early archaeological site of Nauwalabila I, Arnhem Land, Australia: implications for sample suitability and stratigraphic integrity". Quaternary Science Reviews. 21 (8–9): 1061–1075. Bibcode:2002QSRv...21.1061B. doi:10.1016/S0277-3791(01)00058-0 – via ResearchGate.
- "Black Comedy". ABC TV.
- Blainey, Geoffrey (1980). A Land Half Won. South Melbourne: Macmillan. p. 75. ISBN 978-0-333-29949-4.
- "Blak History Month". Blak History Month. n.d.
- "BlakLash beginnings". BlakLash Creative. n.d.
- Blandowski, W. von (1862). Australien in 142 Photographischen Abbildungen (in German). Gleiwitz, Germany: Gustav Neumann.
- Blandowski, W. von (1862). "Australia in 142 Photographic Illustrations after a Decade of Experiences". Gustav Neumann – via World Digital Library.
- Bleakley, John William (1929). The Aboriginals and Half-Castes of Central Australia and North Australia (PDF). Melbourne: Government Printer. p. 17.
- Boehme, Jacob (24 April 2017). "Indigenous performing arts is a testament to collective drive and vision". IndigenousX.
- Bottoms, Timothy (2013). Conspiracy of Silence: Queensland's frontier killing times. Sydney: Allen and Unwin. pp. 1–208. ISBN 978-1-74331-382-4.
- Bowern, Claire; Harold, K, eds. (2004). Australian Languages: Classification and the comparative method. Sydney: John Benjamins. ISBN 978-90-272-4761-2.
- Bowler, James M; Johnston, H; Olley, J M; Prescott, John R; Roberts, Richard G; Shawcross, Wilfred; Spooner, Nigel A (20 February 2003). "New ages for human occupation and climatic change at Lake Mungo, Australia". Nature. 421 (6925): 837–840. Bibcode:2003Natur.421..837B. doi:10.1038/nature01383. PMID 12594511. S2CID 4365526.
- Brennan, Frank (21 February 2008). "The History of Apologies Down Under". Thinking Faith – Online Journal of the British Jesuits. Archived from the original on 2 December 2014.
- "Bringing them home education module". Australian Human Rights Commission. Archived from the original on 22 July 2008. The laws:
  - Australian Capital Territory;
  - New South Wales;
  - Northern Territory;
  - Queensland Queensland;
  - South Australia;
  - Tasmania;
  - Victoria;
  - Western Australia
- Broome, Richard (2010). Aboriginal Australians: A History Since 1788. Allen & Unwin. ISBN 978-1-741-76554-0.
- Brown, Peter James (18 November 2015) [First published 2002]. "Lake Mungo 3". peterbrown-palaeoanthropology.net.
- Burton, John (n.d.). "History of Torres Strait to 1879 – a regional view". Torres Strait Regional Authority. Archived from the original on 15 May 2009.
- Callaway, E. (2011). "First Aboriginal genome sequenced". Nature. doi:10.1038/news.2011.551.
- Campbell, Judy (2007). Invisible Invaders: Smallpox and Other Diseases in Aboriginal Australia, 1780–1880. Carlton, Vic: Melbourne UP. ISBN 978-0-522-84939-4.
- Carey, Stephen P.; Sherwood, John E.; Price, David M.; Bowler, Jim M. (2018). "The Moyjil site, south-west Victoria, Australia: fire and environment in a 120,000-year coastal midden — nature or people?". Proceedings of the Royal Society of Victoria. 130 (2): 71–93. doi:10.1071/rs18007. ISSN 2204-1362.
- Carmody (7 August 2013). "Seminar: The 'myth' of smallpox at Sydney Cove in April 1789". Australian National University. Archived from the original on 2 February 2017.
- Casey, Maryrose (2009). "Ngapartji Ngapartji: Telling Aboriginal Australian Stories". In Forsyth, Alison; Megson, Chris (eds.). Get Real: Documentary Theatre Past and Present. Palgrave Macmillan. pp. 122–138. ISBN 978-0-230-23694-3.
- "Census of Population and Housing: Reflecting Australia – Stories from the Census, 2016". Australian Bureau of Statistics. 31 October 2017.
- "Centre For 21st Century Humanities". The Centre for 21st Century Humanities. University of Newcastle.
- "Chapter 13. Grounds for Reparation". Bringing them Home (Report). Human Rights and Equal Opportunity Commission Report. Australian Human Rights Commission. April 1997.
- Chrysanthos, Natassia (26 May 2019). "What is the Uluru statement?". The Sydney Morning Herald.
- Clarkson, Chris; Jacobs, Zenobia; Marwick, Ben; Fullagar, Richard; Wallis, Lynley; et al. (19 July 2017). "Human occupation of northern Australia by 65,000 years ago". Nature. 547 (7663): 306–310. Bibcode:2017Natur.547..306C. doi:10.1038/nature22968. hdl:2440/107043. PMID 28726833. S2CID 205257212.
- "Classified Advertising". Hobart Town Courier. Vol. 1, no. 56. 8 November 1828. p. 1 – via Trove.
- Close the Gap report – "Our Choices, Our Voices" (2019) (Report). Australian Human Rights Commission. 2019.
- "Closing the Gap Report 2018". Indigenous Accountants Australia. 14 February 2018. Archived from the original on 30 October 2018.
- Closing the Gap Report 2019 (PDF). Commonwealth of Australia. Dept. of the Prime Minister and Cabinet. 2019. ISBN 978-1-925363-84-5. Archived from the original (PDF) on 26 December 2019 – via NIAA.
- "Collaborating for Indigenous Rights 1957–1973". National Museum of Australia. Archived from the original on 6 July 2011.
- "Collaborating for Indigenous Rights: Freedom Ride, 1965". National Museum of Australia.
- "Collaborating for Indigenous Rights: Wave Hill walk off, 1966–1967". National Museum of Australia.
- Collard, Sarah (5 May 2022). "Meet the Indigenous candidates vying for your vote". NITV.
- "Collections: Aboriginal & Torres Strait Islander art". National Gallery of Australia. Archived from the original on 29 July 2013.
- "Colliding worlds: first contact in the western desert, 1932–1984". National Museum of Australia.
- "Colonial frontier massacres in Central and Eastern Australia, 1788–1930: Introduction". The Centre for 21st Century Humanities, University of Newcastle.
- Commonwealth v Tasmania (Tasmanian Dams Case) [1983] HCA 21, (1983) 158 CLR 1 (1 July 1983), High Court (Australia)
- "Community, identity, wellbeing: The report of the Second National Indigenous Languages Survey". AIATSIS. 2014. Archived from the original on 24 April 2015.
- Condon, Matthew (7 October 2011). "Street names a reminder of our racist past and they should go". The Courier Mail.
- Connell, Rachel (1998). "Who is an 'Aboriginal Person'?: Shaw v Wolf". Indigenous Law Bulletin. 4 (12). Australasian Legal Information Institute – via austlii.
- Connor, Liz (2016). Skin Deep: Settler impressions of Aboriginal women. University of WA Publishing. ISBN 978-1-74258-807-0.
- Convery, Stephanie (15 December 2021). "Indigenous Australians make up almost 30% of hospitalisations due to domestic violence, report finds". The Guardian.
- "Cook, James (1728–1779)". Australian Dictionary of Biography. Vol. 1. National Centre of Biography, Australian National University. 1966.
- Cooper, A. (2001). "Human Origins and Ancient Human DNA". Science. 292 (5522): 1655–1656. Bibcode:2001Sci...292.1655C. doi:10.1126/science.292.5522.1655. PMID 11388352. S2CID 37303807.
- Costa, Jedda; Dunstan, Joseph (11 December 2019). "'We are taking this place back': Treaty assembly sits in Victoria's Upper House". ABC News.
- Cronshaw, Damon (23 February 2018). "A body in the bush or an urban legend?". Newcastle Herald. Archived from the original on 30 May 2019.
- Culotta, Elizabeth; Gibbons, Ann (21 September 2016). "Almost all living people outside of Africa trace back to a single migration more than 50,000 years ago". Science.
- Daley, Paul (15 July 2014). "Why the number of Indigenous deaths in the frontier wars matters". The Guardian.
- Darian-Smith, Kate (26 January 2017). "Australia Day, Invasion Day, Survival Day: a long history of celebration and contestation". The Conversation.
- David, Bruno; McNiven, Ian; Mitchell, Rod; Orr, Meredith; Haberle, Simon; et al. (July 2004). "Badu 15 and the Papuan-Austronesian settlement of Torres Strait". Archaeology in Oceania. 39 (2): 65–78. doi:10.1002/j.1834-4453.2004.tb00564.x.
- Davidson, Helen; Wahlquist, Calla (20 July 2017). "Australian dig finds evidence of Aboriginal habitation up to 80,000 years ago". The Guardian.
- "Dead Heart (1996) on ASO – Australia's audio and visual heritage online". australianscreen.
- "Death forms undermine promises". National Indigenous Times. No. 157. 10 July 2008.
- "Defence, Discrimination and Regrets". Q&A. Australian Broadcasting Corporation. 11 April 2011. Archived from the original on 11 May 2011.
- Moses, A. Dirk (1 September 2017). "Who is Really Airbrushing the Past? Genocide, Slavery and the Return of the Colonial Repressed". ABC Religion & Ethics.
- "Disproportionate incarceration rate". ALRC. 9 January 2018.
- Dixon, R. M. W. (1997). The Rise and Fall of Languages. Cambridge University Press. ISBN 978-0-521-62654-5.
- "Documenting a Democracy: Yirrkala bark petitions 1963 (Cth)". National Archives of Australia. Archived from the original on 1 June 2011.
- "Draft Targets". Closing the Gap. National Indigenous Australians Agency. December 2018.
- "'The Dreaming'". Common Ground.
- Dunbar-Hall, P.; Gibson, C. (2000). "Singing about nations within nations: Geopolitics and identity in Australian indigenous rock music". Popular Music and Society. 24 (2): 45–73. doi:10.1080/03007760008591767. S2CID 190738751.
- Dunstan, Joseph (5 November 2019). "Victorian Aboriginal voters have elected a treaty assembly. So what's next?". ABC News.
- "Education | Closing the Gap". Australian Government: Office of the Prime Minister and Cabinet. Archived from the original on 30 October 2018.
- Ellender, Isabel; Christiansen, Peter (2001). People of the Merri Merri: The Wurundjeri in Colonial Days. Merri Creek Management Committee. p. 45. ISBN 978-0-9577728-0-9.
- "Encyclopedia". Australian War Memorial. Archived from the original on 24 February 2009.
- "Aboriginal and Torres Strait Islander people: Census". Australian Bureau of Statistics. June 2022.
- "Estimates of Aboriginal and Torres Strait Islander Australians". Australian Bureau of Statistics. June 2016.
- "Ethnologue report for language code: ulk". Ethnologue.com.
- Evans, Nicholas (2003). The non-Pama-Nyungan languages of northern Australia: comparative studies of the continent's most linguistically complex region. Canberra Australia: Australian National University. ISBN 978-0-85883-538-2.
- Evans, Raymond (2007). A History of Queensland. Cambridge University Press. ISBN 978-0-521-87692-6.
- Evans, Raymond; Ørsted-Jensen, Robert (2014). "I cannot say the numbers that were killed": assessing violent mortality on the Queensland frontier (PDF). The Australian Historical Association 33rd Annual Conference. Conflict in History. Fullarton, SA: sapro Conference Management. p. 28. doi:10.2139/ssrn.2467836.
- "Face the Facts: Questions and Answers about Aboriginal & Torres Strait Islander Peoples" (PDF). Australian Human Rights Commission. 2005.
- Family violence among Aboriginal and Torres Strait Islander peoples, Summary. Australian Institute of Health and Welfare. 1 November 2006. ISBN 978-1-74024-620-0. Attribution 4.0 International (CC BY 4.0) licence.
- Farnsworth, Sarah (21 September 2007). "Kids play "kick to kick" −1850s style". ABC. Archived from the original on 13 October 2007.
- Ferrier, Åsa (2015). "Chapter 1. Research Framework". Journeys into the rainforest: Archaeology of culture change and continuity on the Evelyn Tableland, North Queensland. Terra australis 43. ISBN 978-1-925022-88-9 – via ANU.
- "Festival de Cannes: Ten Canoes". Festival de Cannes. 2006.
- Fiona, R (2007). The Soundscapes of Australia: Music, Place And Spirituality. Ashgate Publishing. ISBN 978-0-7546-4072-1.
- "First Aboriginal politician in NT dies". ABC. 7 April 2009.
- "First Australian Aboriginal in House of Representatives". BBC. 29 August 2010.
- "First encounters and frontier conflict". Australian Institute of Aboriginal and Torres Strait Islander Studies. 11 September 2015.
- "First Peoples of Australia". MCA.
- "Five Fast Facts – The Aboriginal Tent Embassy" (PDF). June 2013. Archived from the original (PDF) on 21 March 2019.
- Flood, Josephine (1984). Archaeology of the Dreamtime: The Story of prehistoric Australia and its people. University of Hawaii Press. ISBN 978-0-207-18448-2.
- Flood, Josephine (2019). The Original Australians: The Story of the Aboriginal People (2nd ed.). Crows Nest, NSW: Allen & Unwin. ISBN 978-1-76052-707-5.
- Fogarty, John; Dwyer, Jacinta (2012). "The First Aboriginal Land Rights Case". In Sykes, Helen (ed.). More or less: democracy & new media (PDF). Future Leaders. ISBN 978-0-9803320-7-0.
- Foley, Dennis (2007). "Leadership: the quandary of Aboriginal societies in crises, 1788 – 1830, and 1966". In Macfarlane, Ingereth; Hannah, Mark (eds.). Transgressions: Critical Australian Indigenous histories. Aboriginal History Monographs. Vol. 16. ANU Press. pp. 177–192. ISBN 978-1-921-31344-8. JSTOR j.ctt24hfb0.12.
- Forum (October 2001). "Mitochondrial DNA sequences in ancient Australian" (PDF). Archaeology in Oceania. 36 (3): 163–174. doi:10.1002/j.1834-4453.2001.tb00490.x. Archived from the original (PDF) on 15 May 2013.
  - G. J. Adcock; E. S. Dennis; S. Esteal [sic]; G. A. Huttley; L. S. Jermiin; W. J. Peacock; A. Thorne. "Mitochondrial DNA sequences in ancient Australians: Implications for modern human origins. (Abstract)". In Forum (2001), p. 163.
  - J. W. H. Trueman. "Does the Lake Mungo 3 mtDNA evidence stand up to analysis?". In Forum (2001), pp. 163–165.
  - Colin Groves. "Lake Mungo 3 and his DNA". In Forum (2001), p. 166–167.
  - D. J. Colgan. "Commentary on G. J. Adconck, et al., 2001 "Mitochondrial DNA sequences in ancient Australians: implications for modern human origins". In Forum (2001), p. 168–169.
  - Gregory J. Adcock; Elizabeth S. Dennis; Simon Easteal; Gavin A. Huttley; Lars S. Jermiin; W. James Peacock; Alan Thorne. "Lake Mungo 3: A response to recent critiques". In Forum (2001), pp. 170–174.
- Gammage, Bill (2011). The biggest estate on earth: how Aborigines made Australia. Crows Nest, N.S.W.: Allen & Unwin. ISBN 978-1-74237-748-3. OCLC 746307071.
- Gardiner-Garden, John (5 December 2000). "Research Note 18 2000–01: The Definition of Aboriginality". Parliament of Australia, Parliamentary Library. Archived from the original on 7 February 2012.
- Gerritsen, Rupert (2008). Australia and the origins of agriculture. Oxford: Archaeopress. ISBN 978-1-4073-0354-3. OCLC 298595987.
- "GF's Koori History Website – Koori History Images – 1930s". Kooriweb.org. 26 January 1938.
- Gibson, Joel (27 October 2007). "One policy, two camps – the takeover rift". The Sydney Morning Herald.
- Gilbert, Kevin (1977). Living Black: Blacks Talk to Kevin Gilbert. Allen Lane, The Penguin Press. ISBN 978-0-7139-1112-1.
- Glynn, Ian; Jenifer, G (2004). The Life and Death of Smallpox. Cambridge University Press. pp. 145–146. ISBN 978-0-521-84542-7 – via Internet Archive.
- Gobbett, Hannah (11 July 2017). "Indigenous parliamentarians, federal and state: a quick guide". Canberra: Parliament of Australian.
- Gough, Myles (11 May 2011). "Prehistoric Australian Aboriginal populations were growing". Cosmos Magazine. Archived from the original on 12 September 2012.
- Graves, Randin (2 June 2017). "Yolngu are People 2: They're not Clip Art". Yidaki History.
- Greg Gardiner, Eleanor Bourke (2002). "Indigenous Populations, Mixed Discourses and Identities" (PDF). People and Place Volume 8 No 2 Monash University. Archived from the original (PDF) on 13 September 2009.
- Guantai, Natasha (10 March 2015). "'Are there Black people in Australia?'". Overland.
- Harman, Kristyn (17 January 2018). "Explainer: the evidence for the Tasmanian genocide". The Conversation.
- Harper, Fiona (15 March 2017). "5 of the best Aboriginal experiences in Tropical North Queensland". Australian Geographic.
- Hawley, Samantha (28 August 2009). "UN's claims of "racist" NT intervention are widely condemned". Australian Broadcasting Corporation.
- Haydar, Nour (7 September 2021). "Women's Safety Minister agrees to develop separate plan to halt violence in Indigenous communities". ABC News.
- "Healthy People Healthy Country". EnviroNorth. Archived from the original on 23 May 2013.
- Heath, Jeffrey G. (20 June 2017). "Australian Aboriginal languages". Encyclopædia Britannica.
- Heiss, Anita; Melodie-Jane, G (2013). "Aboriginal People and Place". Barani: Sydney's Aboriginal History. City of Sydney.
- Higgins, Isabella; Collard, Sarah (28 April 2020). "Captain James Cook's landing and the Indigenous first words contested by Aboriginal leaders". ABC News.
- Hilferti, Tim (24 October 2010). "The Australian Game". The Advertiser. p. 79.
- "Historian dismisses Tasmanian aboriginal genocide 'myth'". PM show (Transcript). ABC Local Radio. 12 December 2002.
- "Historic day for new indigenous minister". 9News. AAP. 26 May 2019.
- "History". Blackwell Public School. Archived from the original on 20 February 2012.
- "History of Indigenous wages". Government of Queensland. 17 March 2016. Archived from the original on 28 June 2016.
- "The History of the Central Land Council". Central Land Council, Australia. Archived from the original on 24 September 2020.
- "History of the Didgeridoo Yidaki". Aboriginal Arts. Archived from the original on 3 March 2009.
- Hobbs, Harry; Williams, George (16 April 2018). "Australia's First Treaty". AUSPUBLAW.
- Hodge, Robert (1990). "Aboriginal truth and white media: Eric Michaels meets the spirit of Aboriginalism". The Australian Journal of Media & Culture. 3 (2). Archived from the original on 21 July 2012.. Dhakiyarr is named "Tuckiar" in the proceedings and is referred to in the main judgment as "a completely uncivilised aboriginal native". The decision was unanimous and strongly criticised the conduct of the trial. Division 4AA.
- "Home". Indigenous Desert Alliance.
- Horn, Allyson (24 June 2019). "Ash Barty number one world ranking sends Queensland into overdrive". ABC News.
- Horton, David R. (1996). "AIATSIS map of Indigenous Australia". AIATSIS.
- Horton, Jessica (2015). "'Willing to fight to a man': The First World War and Aboriginal activism in the Western District of Victoria". Aboriginal History. 39: 203–222. doi:10.22459/AH.39.2015.10. JSTOR 43687042.
- Howden, Saffron (2 November 2015). "Murrumu Walubara Yidindji renounces citizenship to reclaim Australia". The Age.
- Hudjashov, G.; Kivisild, T.; Underhill, P. A.; Endicott, P.; Sanchez, J. J.; Lin, A. A.; Shen, P.; Oefner, P.; Renfrew, C.; Villems, R.; Forster, P. (2007). "Revealing the prehistoric settlement of Australia by Y chromosome and mtDNA analysis". Proceedings of the National Academy of Sciences. 104 (21): 8726–8730. Bibcode:2007PNAS..104.8726H. doi:10.1073/pnas.0702928104. PMC 1885570. PMID 17496137.
- Hugo, Graeme (March 2012). "Population Distribution, Migration and Climate Change in Australia: An Exploration" (PDF). NCCARF. Archived from the original (PDF) on 13 November 2013.
- "'I am the first!' Linda Burney proclaims history for Indigenous people, women". Australian Broadcasting Corporation. 3 July 2016b.
- "Imprisonment rates of Indigenous women a national shame". Australian Human Rights Commission. 2 May 2018. Archived from the original on 30 October 2018.
- "Indigenous Australia: Family". Australian Museum. 2004. Archived from the original on 18 November 2000.
- "Indigenous Australian ethnic group". 2018 Census ethnic group summaries. Stats NZ.
- "Indigenous Australians: Aboriginal and Torres Strait Islander people". AIATSIS. 3 June 2015.
- "The Indigenous Collection". National Gallery of Victoria. Archived from the original on 14 June 2010.
- "Indigenous Coordination Centre (ICC)". Agreements, Treaties and Negotiated Settlements (ATNS) project. Archived from the original on 19 March 2020.
- "Indigenous disadvantage in Australia". Australians Together. 16 September 2020.
- "Indigenous vote decided outcome in the Territory". The Australian. 22 September 2012.
- "INSPIRE: Kelvin Kong". The Australian. 2 August 2008.
- "The International Rugby Hall of Fame". Rugby Hall of Fame. 9 October 2007.
- Jaensch, Dean (1994). Point of order!: The Legislative Assembly of the Northern Territory 1974–1994. Darwin: Legislative Assembly of the Northern Territory. ISBN 0-7315-2076-9.
- Jeuniewic, Lexie (11 April 2022). "Historic all-Aboriginal senate ticket to propel 'climate justice', 'heal our land, our water'". ABC News.
- "JEDDA". Festival de Cannes. 22 May 2011. Archived from the original on 18 January 2012.
- "Journey to handback". Australian Institute of Aboriginal and Torres Strait Islander Studies. 7 October 2015. Archived from the original on 19 September 2020.
- "Kakadu: Rock art". Parks Australia. Archived from the original on 30 January 2017.
- "Karla Grant". ANZSOG. n.d.
- Karvelas, Patricia (20 January 2012). "Historic Constitution vote over indigenous recognition facing hurdles". The Australian. Archived from the original on 19 January 2012.
- Kayser, M; Brauer, Silke; Weiss, Gunter; Schiefenhövel, Wulf; Underhill, Peter; Shen, Peidong; Oefner, Peter; Tommaseo-Ponzetta, Mila; Stoneking, Mark (2003). "Reduced Y-Chromosome, but Not Mitochondrial DNA, Diversity in Human Populations from West New Guinea". The American Journal of Human Genetics. 72 (2): 281–302. Bibcode:2003AmJHG..72..281K. doi:10.1086/346065. PMC 379223. PMID 12532283.
- Kelly, Paul (1 September 2010). "From Little Things Big Things Grow". paulkelly.com. Archived from the original on 28 November 2011.
- Kelsey-Sugg, Anna (6 July 2022). "Indigenous Australian population figures jumped in latest Census as pride increases and fears abate". ABC News.
- Kennedy, Brian; Kennedy, Barbara (1992). Australian Place Names. Hodder & Stoughton.
- Ker, Peter (23 August 2010). "Wyatt likes the odd but keeping his cards close in Hasluck". The Sydney Morning Herald.
- Kirk, Alexandra (24 February 2010). "UN rapporteur raps NT intervention". The World Today. Australian Broadcasting Corporation. Archived from the original on 17 March 2010.
- Kociumbas, Jan (2004). "Genocide and Modernity in Colonial Australia". In Moses, A. Dirk (ed.). Genocide and Settler Society: Frontier Violence and Stolen Indigenous Children in Australian History. War and Genocide. Berghahn Books. pp. 79ff. ISBN 978-1-57181-410-4.
- "Kong Family – Koori doctors". George Negus Tonight. Australia: ABC. 14 October 2003. Archived from the original on 4 April 2010.
- Korff, Jens (21 January 2018a). "Aboriginal history timeline (1770–1899)". Creative Spirits. Archived from the original on 14 December 2018.
- Korff, Jens (17 July 2018b). "Australia has a history of Aboriginal slavery". Creative Spirits.
- Korff, Jens (29 April 2019b). "Aboriginal Christians & Christianity". Creative Spirits.
- Korff, Jens (29 July 2021b). "Aboriginal prison rates". Creative Spirits.
- Korff, Jens (3 December 2021a). "Appropriate words & terminology for First Nations topics". Creative Spirits.
- Korff, Jens (16 May 2022). "Domestic and family violence". Creative Spirits.
- Lack, Clem Llewellyn (1963). "The Story of Cape York Peninsula: Part II: Torres Strait Saga". Journal of the Royal Historical Society of Queensland. 7 (1): 132–153. ISSN 0085-5804.
- "Land rights". Australian Institute of Aboriginal and Torres Strait Islander Studies. 3 June 2015.
- "Language and Terminology Guide" (PDF) (Version 1.3 ed.). Australians Together. April 2020.
- "Languages of Aboriginal And Torres Strait Islander Peoples – a Uniquely Australian Heritage". Australian Bureau of Statistics. 23 November 2012.
- Latimore, Jack (30 August 2021). "Blak, Black, Blackfulla: Language is important, but it can be tricky". The Sydney Morning Herald.
- Lawford, Elliana; Zillman, Stephanie (18 August 2016). "Timeline: From Wave Hill protest to land handbacks". ABC News.
- Lehmann, Petra (1997). "The Music Culture and Music System of Aboriginal Australia". In Riemenschneider, Dieter; Davis, Geoffrey V. (eds.). Ar̲atjara: Aboriginal Culture and Literature in Australia. Amsterdam; Atlanta, GA: Editions Rodopi. ISBN 978-90-420-0151-0.
- Lemkin, Raphael (1944). Axis Rule in Occupied Europe. Washington: Carnegie Endowment for International Peace: Division of International Law. p. 79.
- Lipson, Mark; Reich, David (10 January 2017). "A working model of the deep relationships of diverse modern human genetic lineages outside of Africa". Molecular Biology and Evolution. 34 (4): 889–902. doi:10.1093/molbev/msw293. ISSN 0737-4038. PMC 5400393. PMID 28074030.
- "Living with the Past". FOCUS Asia-Pacific. Vol. 9. September 1997. Archived from the original on 26 September 2009.
- Lloyd, Brian (18 March 2009). "Dedicated Indigenous representation in the Australian Parliament, Research Paper 2008–09". Parliament of Australia, Politics and Public Administration Section.
- Lloyd, J (5 January 2011). "Wyatt to challenge for WA Labor leadership". The Sydney Morning Herald.
- Lockwood, Christine (2017). "4. Early encounters on the Adelaide Plains and Encounter Bay". In Brock, Peggy; Gara, Tom (eds.). Colonialism and its Aftermath: A history of Aboriginal South Australia. Wakefield Press. pp. 65–81. ISBN 978-1-74305-499-4.
- Londey, Peter. "Indigenous Australian servicemen". Australian War Memorial. Archived from the original on 5 September 2016.
- Loxley, Anne (3 August 2002). "Pila Nguru: The Spinifex People". The Sydney Morning Herald.
- Kim, Sharnie; Stephen, Adam (18 June 2020). "Cooktown's Indigenous people help commemorate 250 years since Captain Cook's landing with re-enactment". ABC News.
- "Mabo and Native Title". Australians Together.
- "Mabo v Queensland (No 2) ('Mabo case') [1992] HCA 23; (1992) 175 CLR 1". Australasian Legal Information Institute. 3 June 1992.
- MacAulay, V.; Hill, C.; Achilli, A.; Rengo, C.; Clarke, D.; et al. (2005). "Single, Rapid Coastal Settlement of Asia Revealed by Analysis of Complete Mitochondrial Genomes" (PDF). Science. 308 (5724): 1034–1036. Bibcode:2005Sci...308.1034M. doi:10.1126/science.1109792. PMID 15890885. S2CID 31243109.
- MacKnight, C. C. (1986). "Macassans and the Aboriginal past". Archaeology in Oceania. 21: 69–75. doi:10.1002/j.1834-4453.1986.tb00126.x.
- Maddox, Garry; AAP (29 May 2006). "Canoes set Cannes jury afloat". The Sydney Morning Herald. Archived from the original on 15 August 2022.
- Madley, B. (2012). "From Terror to Genocide: Britain's Tasmanian Penal Colony and Australia's History Wars". The Journal of British Studies. 47: 77–106. doi:10.1086/522350. S2CID 146190611.
- Maher, Louise (8 August 2013). "Treasure Trove: Bennelong's letter". 666 ABC Canberra. Australian Broadcasting Corporation.
- Malaspinas, Anna-Sapfo; Westaway, Michael C.; Muller, Craig; Sousa, Vitor C.; Lao, Oscar; et al. (21 September 2016). "A genomic history of Aboriginal Australia". Nature (Submitted manuscript). 538 (7624): 207–214. Bibcode:2016Natur.538..207M. doi:10.1038/nature18299. hdl:10754/622366. PMC 7617037. PMID 27654914. S2CID 4471731.
- Mallick, Swapan; Li, Heng; Lipson, Mark; Mathieson, Iain (21 September 2016). "The Simons Genome Diversity Project: 300 genomes from 142 diverse populations". Nature. 538 (13 October 2016): 201–206. Bibcode:2016Natur.538..201M. doi:10.1038/nature18964. PMC 5161557. PMID 27654912.
- Manfred, K; Mark, S; Irina, P; Frederick, D; Ellen, G (14 January 2013). "Genome-wide data substantiate Holocene gene flow from India to Australia". PNAS. 110 (5): 1803–1808. Bibcode:2013PNAS..110.1803P. doi:10.1073/pnas.1211927110. PMC 3562786. PMID 23319617.
- "Mapping the massacres of Australia's colonial frontier". University of Newcastle, Australia. 5 July 2017b.
- Marcus, S (3 November 2016). "Astounding archaeology discovery places inland human occupation of Australia at 49,000 years". The Sydney Morning Herald.
- Marten, James A. (2002). Children and War: A Historical Anthology. New York: New York University Press. p. 229. ISBN 978-0-8147-5667-6.
- Maynard, John; Haskins, Victoria (2016). Living with the Locals: Early Europeans' Experience of Indigenous Life. National Library of Australia. ISBN 978-0-642-27895-1.
- McCallum, Kerry; Waller, Lisa (June–July 2012). "Failed state of health". Arena Magazine. No. 118. Fitzroy, Victoria. pp. 33–34. eISSN 1837-2317. ISSN 1039-1010.
- McEvoy, B. P.; Lind, J. M.; Wang, E. T.; Moyzis, R. K.; Visscher, P. M.; Van Holst Pellekaan, S. M.; Wilton, A. N. (2010). "Whole-Genome Genetic Diversity in a Sample of Australians with Deep Aboriginal Ancestry". The American Journal of Human Genetics. 87 (2): 297–305. Bibcode:2010AmJHG..87..297M. doi:10.1016/j.ajhg.2010.07.008. PMC 2917718. PMID 20691402.
  "Some individuals are close to the Oceanic cluster, composed of MEL and PAP individuals but most occupy a wide range on PC2 between Europeans and East Asians, generally falling in an area occupied by Central and South Asian populations."
- McGregor, R. (December 2016). "Making the Rainforest Aboriginal: Tindale and Birdsell's foray into deep time". Memoirs of the Queensland Museum – Culture. 10. Brisbane: 9–21. doi:10.17082/j.2205-3239.10.2016-02. ISSN 2205-3220.
- McIlroy, Tom (8 August 2013). "Chickenpox blamed for Aboriginal deaths". The Canberra Times.
- McIlroy, Tom (19 April 2015). "The Aboriginal Tent Embassy has been left off the ACT heritage list". The Canberra Times. Archived from the original on 24 October 2018.
- McKenna, Mark (4 April 2000). "First Words: A Brief History of Public Debate on a New Preamble to the Australian Constitution 1991–1999 (Research Paper 16 1999–2000)". Parliament of Australia, Parliamentary Library. Archived from the original on 16 February 2012.
- McMah, Lauren (2 February 2016). "What's wrong with this street sign?". news.com.au.
- McNiven, Ian (2004). "Saltwater People: spiritscapes, maritime rituals and the archaeology of Australian indigenous seascapes". World Archaeology. 35 (3): 329–349. Bibcode:2004WoArc..35..329M. doi:10.1080/0043824042000185757. ISSN 0043-8243. S2CID 162362872.
- Mear, Craig (2008). "The Origin of the Smallpox Outbreak in Sydney in 1789". Journal of the Royal Australian Historical Society. 94 (1): 1–22. Archived from the original on 6 April 2012.
- Melville, Kirsti (25 October 2016). "Rottnest Island: Black prison to white playground". ABC News.
- Mercer, Phil (31 March 2003). "Aborigines turn to Islam". BBC.
- "Mills dumped as Giles takes top Territory job". ABC News. 13 March 2013.
- "Modern Australian poetry". Australian Government Culture and Recreation Portal. Archived from the original on 23 July 2007.
- Morris, John (2001). "The Tiwi and the British: an ill-fated outpost" (PDF). Aboriginal History. 25: 245.
- Mulvaney, D. J. (1990). "Sir Walter Baldwin Spencer (1860–1929)". Australian Dictionary of Biography. Vol. 12. National Centre of Biography, Australian National University.
- Mundine, Graeme (17 April 2005). "Pope John Paul II's Indigenous legacy". European Network for Indigenous Australian Rights (ENIAR). Archived from the original on 1 July 2005.
- "Mungo Lady and Mungo Man". Mungo National Park.
- Munro, Kate L. (7 May 2020). "Why 'Blak' not Black?: Artist Destiny Deacon and the origins of this word". NITV. Special Broadcasting Service.
- Munro, Keith; McLisky, Justine, eds. (November 2004). Destiny Deacon: Walk & don't look blak Resource Kit (PDF) (Report). MCA Education. Sydney, NSW, Australia: Museum of Contemporary Art Ltd. Archived from the original (PDF) on 21 August 2006.
- Balla, Paola (2021). "The Blakyard". Paradise Journal (1).
- Murphy, Sean (17 November 2017). "Rottnest's Aboriginal prisoners are Australia's forgotten patriots: elder". ABC News.
- Nagle, N; Ballantyne, KN; van Oven, M; Tyler-Smith, C; Xue, Y; et al. (2015). "Antiquity and diversity of aboriginal Australian Y-chromosomes". American Journal of Physical Anthropology. 159 (3): 367–381. Bibcode:2016AJPA..159..367N. doi:10.1002/ajpa.22886. PMID 26515539. S2CID 2225529.
- National Drug Strategy 2017–2026 (PDF) (Report). Publications Number: 11814. Australian Government. Department of Health. June 2017. Archived from the original (PDF) on 16 January 2020.
- "National Heritage Places – Budj Bim National Heritage Landscape". Australian Government Department of Sustainability, Environment, Water, Population and Communities.
- "National Park visitors search kitchen middens". The Herald. Victoria, Australia. 19 November 1919. p. 3 – via Trove.
- Neubauer, Ian Lloyd (30 May 2013). "Australia's Aborigines Launch a Bold Legal Push for Independence". Time.
- "The new corroboree – Music – Entertainment". The Age. 1 April 2006.
- "New map records massacres of Aboriginal people". ABC News. 5 July 2017.
- Newton, Janice (1990). "Becoming 'Authentic' Australians through Music". Social Analysis: The International Journal of Social and Cultural Practice. 27 (27): 93–101. JSTOR 23164573.
- Ngaanyatjarra Pitjantjatjara Yankunytjatjara Women's Council Aboriginal Corporation (2013). Traditional Healers of Central Australia: Ngangkari. Broome, WA: Magabala Books. pp. 15–19. ISBN 978-1-921248-82-5.
- Nicol, Emily (6 March 2022). "Greens announce all First Nations Senate ticket in Victoria". NITV.
- "Noel Pearson's statement on Kevin Rudd". The Australian. 23 November 2007. Archived from the original on 15 December 2008.
- Norman, Jane (22 July 2016). "Bill Shorten keeps Kim Carr on frontbench in shadow ministry shuffle". Australian Broadcasting Corporation.
- "Nulungu Reconciliation Lecture". Australian Human Rights Commission. 21 August 2014.
- Nunn, Gary; Mao, Frances (28 May 2019). "Ken Wyatt: Australia's first indigenous cabinet minister". BBC News.
- Offer, Marnie Banger and Kaitlyn (21 June 2018). "Victoria passes Aboriginal treaty bill". The Age.
- Ogden, John (23 April 2013). "Saltwater People" (Interview). Interviewed by Adams, Phillip. RN.
- "Oldest known evidence of Aboriginal settlement in arid Australia found in Flinders Ranges rock shelter". Australian Broadcasting Corporation. 3 November 2016a.
- Olley, J. M.; Roberts, R. G.; Yoshida, H.; Bowler, J. M. (2006). "Single-grain optical dating of grave-infill associated with human burials at Lake Mungo, Australia". Quaternary Science Reviews. 25 (19–20): 2469–2474. Bibcode:2006QSRv...25.2469O. doi:10.1016/j.quascirev.2005.07.022.
- O'Sullivan, Dominic (n.d.). "The Roman Catholic Church and Indigenous Land Rights in Australia and New Zealand". University of Waikato. Archived from the original (rtf) on 19 May 2013 – via Australian National University.
- O'Sullivan, Dominic (20 March 2017). "Why guaranteed Indigenous seats in parliament could ease inequality". The Conversation.
- "Our Country". Aboriginal Australian Art & Culture. n.d.
- Pardoe, C. (1991). "Isolation and Evolution in Tasmania". Current Anthropology. 32: 1. doi:10.1086/203909. S2CID 146785882.
- Pardoe, C. (2006). "Becoming Australian". Before Farming. 2006: 1–21. doi:10.3828/bfarm.2006.1.4.
- Pascoe, Bruce (1 April 2007). Convincing Ground: Learning to Fall in Love with your Country. Aboriginal Studies Press. pp. 182–185. ISBN 978-0-85575-549-2.
- Pascoe, Bruce (2015). Dark Emu; Black Seeds: Agriculture or Accident. Magaballa Books. ISBN 978-1-911344-78-0.
- Pascoe, Bruce (2018). Dark emu: Aboriginal Australia and the birth of agriculture. Melbourne: Scribe US. ISBN 978-1-947534-08-7. OCLC 1037018065.
- Pearson, Luke (10 August 2017). "What is a Makarrata? It's more than a synonym for treaty". RN. Archived from the original on 5 June 2019.
- "The people and history of the Torres Strait Islands". BBC News. 24 August 2015.
- d'Abbs, Peter; Gillick, Vicki; Hodson, Sally; Kavanagh, Maggie; Payne, Steve; Ray, Tristan (1 July 2019). Longitudinal research into petrol sniffing and other substance abuse trends in Indigenous communities: final report (PDF) (Report). School of Public Health, University of Queensland. Archived from the original (PDF) on 15 January 2020 – via NIAA. A report for the National Indigenous Australians Agency, Health and Wellbeing Branch.
- "Petrol sniffing continues to decline in Indigenous Communities". Ministers Media Centre. Australian Government: Department of Prime Minister and Cabinet. 30 July 2019c. Archived from the original on 27 February 2020.
- "Petrol Sniffing in Remote Northern Territory Communities" (PDF). Northern Territory Government. October 2004. Archived from the original (PDF) on 14 April 2011.
- "Pilbara Rock Art not Affected by Mining Emissions: Study". ABC. 10 February 2009. Archived from the original on 28 June 2011.
- "Places – Torres Strait Islands". ABC Radio. 2005.
- "Population Distribution, Aboriginal and Torres Strait Islander Australians". Australian Bureau of Statistics. 2006.
- Pratt, Angela (11 August 2003). "Research Note no. 5 2003–2004. ATSIC Review: Complex Challenges, No Simple Solutions". Parliament of Australia, Parliamentary Library. Archived from the original on 3 February 2012.
- "Preserving Indigenous culture through language" (Media release). University of South Australia. 16 May 2008. Archived from the original on 5 July 2011.
- "Rabbit-Proof Fence (2002) on ASO – Australia's audio and visual heritage online". australianscreen.
- Rasmussen, M.; Guo, X.; Wang, Y.; Lohmueller, K. E.; Rasmussen, S.; et al. (2011). "An Aboriginal Australian Genome Reveals Separate Human Dispersals into Asia". Science. 334 (6052): 94–98. Bibcode:2011Sci...334...94R. doi:10.1126/science.1211177. PMC 3991479. PMID 21940856.
- Read, Peter (1981). The Stolen Generations: The Removal of Aboriginal children in New South Wales 1883 to 1969 (PDF). Department of Aboriginal Affairs (New South Wales government). ISBN 978-0-646-46221-9. Archived from the original (PDF) on 9 April 2012.
- "Recognising Aboriginal and Torres Strait Islander Peoples in the Constitution: Report of the Expert Panel". Commonwealth of Australia. January 2012.
- "Recognising Aboriginal and Torres Strait Islander Peoples in the Constitution: Report of the Expert Panel [Commentary and Recommendations only]" (PDF). Indigenous Law Bulletin. 7 (28). Australasian Legal Information Institute. 16 January 2012 – via austlii.
- "Recommended Guidelines for Aboriginal and Torres Strait Islander Terminology" (PDF). Queensland University of Technology. 1 April 2015.
- "Reconciliation and other Indigenous Issues". Anglican Church of Australia. 2005. Archived from the original on 16 June 2005.
- "Report of the Expert Panel on recognising Aboriginal and Torres Strait Islander Peoples in the Constitution". ANTaR. 19 January 2012. Archived from the original on 7 July 2020.Recognising Aboriginal and Torres Strait Islander Peoples in the Constitution: Report of the Expert Panel Archived 21 October 2020 at the Wayback Machine
- "Research into petrol sniffing and other substance trends use trends in Indigenous communities: final report". Dovetail. 2 August 2019. Archived from the original on 15 January 2020.
- "Resistance". Australian Institute of Aboriginal and Torres Strait Islander studies. Archived from the original on 21 February 2019.
- Reynolds, Henry (2013). Forgotten War. Sydney: NewSouth. pp. 121–134. ISBN 978-1-74223-392-5.
- Richards, Jonathan (2014). ""Many were killed from falling over the cliffs": The naming of Mount Wheeler, Central Queensland" (PDF). In Clark, Ian D; Hercus, Luise; Kostanski, Laura (eds.). Indigenous and minority placenames: Australian and international perspectives. Aboriginal history monographs. ANU Press. pp. 147–161. ISBN 978-1-925021-63-9.
- Rogers, Thomas James; Bain, Stephen (3 February 2016). "Genocide and frontier violence in Australia". Journal of Genocide Research. 18 (1): 83–100. doi:10.1080/14623528.2016.1120466. S2CID 147512803.
- "Roll out of OPAL fuel to help combat petrol sniffing". Department of Health and Ageing. 10 February 2006b. Archived from the original on 3 April 2013.
- Rosenstock, A; Mukandi, B; Zwi, AB; Hill, PS (2013). "Closing the gap: Competing estimates of Indigenous Australian life expectancy in the scientific literature". Australian and New Zealand Journal of Public Health. 37 (4): 356–364. doi:10.1111/1753-6405.12084. PMC 3796865. PMID 23895479.
- Ross, Kate (1999). Population Issues, Indigenous Australians, 1996 (PDF). Canberra: Australian Bureau of Statistics. ISBN 0-642-25684-5. 4708.0 – Occasional Paper.
- Moyal, Ann (21 August 2017). "Arthur Phillip: 1788. The Foundation Year". Australian Dictionary of Biography. National Centre of Biography, Australian National University.
- Rurenga, Declan (9 August 2017). "Wiradjuri artist's painting depicts journey of healing at hospital". Central Western Daily.
- Ryan, Lyndall (1996). The Aboriginal Tasmanians (2nd ed.). Crows Nest: Allen & Unwin. ISBN 978-1-86373-965-8.
- Ryan, Lyndall (30 December 2021). "Colonial Frontier Massacres in Australia". The Centre for 21st Century Humanities.
- "Saltwater people". Reef Catchments. n.d. Archived from the original on 25 November 2020.
- "Saltwater people, saltwater art". Art Gallery of NSW. 2014. Archived from the original on 1 April 2015.
- "Screen Australia's Indigenous Department celebrates 25 years". Screen Australia. 4 June 2018.
- Sentance, Nathan (26 May 2020). "Genocide in Australia". Australian Museum.
- "Sequencing Uncovers a 9,000 Mile Walkabout" (PDF). ICommunity Newsletter. April 2012.
- Simmonds, Alecia (28 April 2015). "Australia needs to own up to its slave history". The Sydney Morning Herald.
- "Sir Douglas Nicholls". Civics and Citizenship Education. 14 June 2005. Archived from the original on 26 March 2021.
- Smith, C. I.; Chamberlain, A. T.; Riley, M. S.; Stringer, C.; Collins, M. J. (2003). "The thermal history of human fossils and the likelihood of successful DNA amplification" (PDF). Journal of Human Evolution. 45 (3): 203–217. Bibcode:2003JHumE..45..203S. doi:10.1016/S0047-2484(03)00106-4. PMID 14580590. S2CID 2517580.
- Smyth, Dermot; Monaghan, Jim; Smyth; Consultants, Bahrdt (2004). Living on saltwater country: review of literature about Aboriginal rights, use, management and interests in northern Australian marine environments: background paper (PDF). Australian Government. National Oceans Office. ISBN 978-1-877043-40-6. Archived from the original (PDF) on 22 June 2024.
- "Songlines". Common Ground. Archived from the original on 29 February 2020.
- Spencer, Stephen (2006). Race and Ethnicity: Culture, identity and representation. London: Routledge. pp. 33–34. ISBN 978-1-134-26639-5.
- Spinney, Angela (4 July 2016). "FactCheck Q&A: are Indigenous women 34–80 times more likely than average to experience violence?". The Conversation.
- "Spirituality and religion among Torres Strait Islanders". Queensland Curriculum & Assessment Authority. 25 July 2018.
- Spooner, P. G.; Firman, M.; Yalmambirra (2013). "Origins of Travelling Stock Routes. 1. Connections to Indigenous traditional pathways". The Rangeland Journal. 32 (3): 329. doi:10.1071/RJ10009.
- "The spread of people to Australia". Australian Museum.
- "The spread of people to Australia". Australian Museum. 26 May 2011.
- "A statistical overview of Aboriginal and Torres Strait Islander peoples in Australia: Social Justice Report 2008". Australian Human Rights Commission. 2008.
- Summary of Aboriginal and Torres Strait Islander health status 2018. Mount Lawley, WA: Australian Indigenous HealthInfoNet. 2019. ISBN 978-0-6485071-2-3.
- Sweeney, Dominique (2008). Masked Corroborees of the Northwest (film). 47 min.
  - Sweeney, D. (2009). Masked corroborees of the northwest 'stand up in my head' (PhD). Australian National University. doi:10.25911/5D51468201AAE. S2CID 164778361. Archived from the original on 12 February 2020.
- Swift, Brendan (14 June 2011). "ABC series The Straits begins production". If Magazine.
- "Sydney Opera House – Producer, First Nations Programming". Media RING. 21 September 2018. Archived from the original on 27 March 2020.
- Taufik, Leonard; Teixeira, João C.; Llamas, Bastien; Sudoyo, Herawati; Tobler, Raymond; Purnomo, Gludhug A. (December 2022). "Human Genetic Research in Wallacea and Sahul: Recent Findings and Future Prospects". Genes. 13 (12): 2373. doi:10.3390/genes13122373. hdl:2440/137331. ISSN 2073-4425. PMC 9778601. PMID 36553640.
- Taylor, Rebe (2008) [First published 2004]. Unearthed: the Aboriginal Tasmanians of Kangaroo Island. Wakefield Press. ISBN 978-1-862-54798-8.
- Terzon, Emilia; Robinson, Paul (15 May 2018). "Two Queensland mountains to be renamed to rid them of racist connotations". ABC News.
- Thomson, Neil (2001). "Indigenous Australia: Indigenous Health". In Jupp, James (ed.). The Australian people: an encyclopedia of the nation, its people and their Origins. Cambridge University Press. p. 153. ISBN 978-0-521-80789-0.
- Thorley, Peter (2006). "Colliding worlds: first contact in the western desert, 1932–1984". reCollections.nma.gov.au.
- "Timeline: 1960–69: 1967, 27 May referendum". National Museum of Australia. 13 July 1968. Archived from the original on 10 May 2013.
- Tindale, Norman Barnett (1974). Aboriginal Tribes of Australia: Their Terrain, Environmental Controls, Distribution, Limits, and Proper Names (PDF). Australian National University Press. ISBN 978-0-708-10741-6.
- Torre, Giovanni (6 March 2022). "Victorian Greens reveal all-Indigenous senate ticket for Federal election". NIT.
- "Torres Strait history". Torres Strait Council Regional Council.
- "The Tracker (2002) on ASO – Australia's audio and visual heritage online". australianscreen.
- Tuckiar v The King [1934] HCA 49, (1934) 52 CLR 335, High Court (Australia). Dhakiyarr is named "Tuckiar" in the proceedings and is referred to in the main judgment as "a completely uncivilised aboriginal native". The decision was unanimous and strongly criticised the conduct of the trial.
- "Understanding change in counts of Aboriginal and Torres Strait Islander Australians: Census". Australian Bureau of Statistics. 4 April 2023.
- "Uluru Statement from the Heart". Referendum Council. Archived from the original on 6 March 2019.
- "Uluru Statement: a quick guide". Australian Parliamentary Library.
- "Uluru-Kata Tjuta: Rock art". Parks Australia. Archived from the original on 16 October 2013.
- Vines, Gary; Hope, Jeannette (May 1994). Brewarrina Aboriginal fisheries conservation plan (Report). Brewarrina Aboriginal Cultural Museum – via Academia.edu.
- "Voice Co-Design Senior Advisory Group". Ministers Media Centre. Australian Government: Department of Prime Minister and Cabinet. 8 November 2019b. Archived from the original on 1 February 2020.
- "A voice for Indigenous Australians". Ministers Media Centre. Australian Government: Department of Prime Minister and Cabinet. 30 October 2019a. Archived from the original on 1 August 2020.
- Wahlquist, Calla (30 April 2018). "South Australia halts Indigenous treaty talks as premier says he has 'other priorities'". The Guardian.
- Walsh, Michael (1997), Cross cultural communication problems in Aboriginal Australia, Australian National University, North Australia Research Unit, pp. 7–9, ISBN 978-0-7315-2874-5
- Warren, Christopher (March 2014). "Surgeon John White" (PDF). Letters. United Service. 65 (1). The Royal United Services Institute for Defence and Security Studies NSW: 7.
- Welch, Dylan (13 February 2008). "Kevin Rudd says sorry". The Sydney Morning Herald.
- Wellington, Shahni (13 November 2019). "First meeting held by senior body for Indigenous Voice to government". Special Broadcasting Service.
- Wild, Rex; Anderson, Patricia (2007). Ampe Akelyernemane Meke Mekarle: "Little Children are Sacred" (PDF). Northern Territory Government. Board of Inquiry into the Protection of Aboriginal Children from Sexual Abuse. ISBN 978-0-9803874-1-4.
- William, Alan (24 April 2013). "A new population curve for prehistoric Australia". Proceedings of the Royal Society. 280 (1761). Bibcode:2013PBioS.28030486W. doi:10.1098/rspb.2013.0486. PMC 3652441. PMID 23615287.
- Wilson, Ronald (1997). Bringing them home: Report of the National Inquiry into the Separation of Aboriginal and Torres Strait Islander Children from their Families. Sydney: Commonwealth of Australia. p. 275. ISBN 978-0-642-26954-6.
- Wiltshire, Kelly (27 October 2017). "Audiovisual Heritage of Torres Strait Singing and Dancing". AIATSIS. Archived from the original on 21 March 2020.
- Wood, Asmi (2012). "Constitutional Reform 2013: What are we trying to achieve?". Alternative Law Journal. 37 (3): 156. doi:10.1177/1037969X1203700303. S2CID 146744619. Archived from the original on 19 March 2021.
- Wright, Tony (20 July 2017). "Aboriginal archaeological discovery in Kakadu rewrites the history of Australia". The Sydney Morning Herald.
- Wynne, Emma (30 May 2018). "Former Aboriginal prison on Rottnest Island closed for tourist lodging". ABC News.
- Yang, Melinda A. (6 January 2022). "A genetic history of migration, diversification, and admixture in Asia". Human Population Genetics and Genomics. 2 (1) 0001: 1–32. doi:10.47248/hpgg2202010001. ISSN 2770-5005.
- "Yirrkala Bark Petitions – 50 Years On". indigenous.gov.au. Government of Australia. 12 July 2013. Archived from the original on 24 October 2018.
- Youth justice in Australia 2016–17. Cat. no. JUV 116. Australian Institute of Health and Welfare. 2018. ISBN 978-1-76054-339-6. ISSN 2205-5010.
- Zaunmayr, Tom (23 July 2022). "FULL LIST: Record number of Indigenous MPs voted in to serve the Australian people". NIT.
- Zuckermann, Ghilad (26 August 2009). "Aboriginal languages deserve revival". Higher Education. The Australian. Archived from the original on 23 September 2009.
- Zuckermann, Ghil'ad; et al. (2015). ENGAGING – a Guide to Interacting Respectfully and Reciprocally with Aboriginal and Torres Strait Islander People, and their Arts Practices and Intellectual Property (PDF) (Report). Australian Government: Indigenous Culture Support. p. 12. Archived from the original (PDF) on 30 March 2016.
