= Haplogroup HIJK =

Human Y chromosome DNA grouping indicating common ancestry

- Possible time of origin: Approx. 55,300 years BP
- Coalescence age: 54,000 years ago
- Possible place of origin: Eurasia
- Ancestor: Haplogroup GHIJK
- Descendants: H, IJK
- Defining mutations: F929/M578/PF3494/S6397

Haplogroup HIJK, defined by the SNPs F929, M578, PF3494 and S6397, is a common Y-chromosome haplogroup. Like its parent macrohaplogroup GHIJK, Haplogroup HIJK and its subclades comprise the vast majority of the world's male population.

HIJK branches subsequently into two direct descendants: IJK (L15/M523/PF3492/S137) and H (L901/M2939). IJK in turn splits into IJ (F-L15) and K (M9). The descendants of Haplogroup IJ are haplogroups I and J, while Haplogroup K is, ultimately, the ancestor of major haplogroups M, N, O, P, Q, R, S, L, and T.

== Distribution ==
HIJK has not been reported in modern populations or in ancient human remains. Previously basal paragroup HIJK* was reported in a Mesolithic European (Magdalenian), GoyetQ-2, and Upper Paleolithic European (Gravettian), Vestonice16. Later study in 2023 with high quality sequencing of Magdalenian, GoyetQ-2, Gravettian, Vestonice16 were assigned with Haplogroup I.

Populations with high proportions of males who belong to descendant major haplogroups of Haplogroup HIJK live across widely dispersed areas and populations.

Males belonging to other subclades of IJK are concentrated in, for example:

- Europe and Central Asia (e. g. haplogroups I, J, N, Q and R);
- the Middle East and North East Africa (e. g. haplogroups J and T);
- South Asia (e.g. haplogroups H, J, L and R);
- Southeast Asia and East Asia (e.g. haplogroup N, O, P)
- Oceania (e. g. haplogroups P, K, M, O and S) and;
- many Native American peoples (e. g. haplogroup Q).

== See also ==
=== Genetics ===
- Conversion table for Y chromosome haplogroups
- Genetic Genealogy
- Genetic history of the Middle East
- Haplogroup
- Haplotype
- Human Y-chromosome DNA haplogroup
- Molecular phylogenetics
- Paragroup
- Subclade
- Y-chromosomal Aaron
- Y-chromosome haplogroups in populations of the world
- Y-DNA haplogroups by ethnic group
- Y-DNA haplogroups in populations of South Asia
