= Haplogroup IJ =

Human Y-chromosome DNA haplogroup

- Possible time of origin: 49,700–44,600 years BP
- Possible place of origin: South West Asia, Caucasus
- Ancestor: IJK
- Descendants: I, J
- Defining mutations: M429/P125, P123, P124, P126, P127, P129, P130, S2, S22

Haplogroup IJ (M429/P125) is a human Y-chromosome DNA haplogroup, an immediate descendant of Haplogroup IJK (formerly known as Haplogroup F-L15). IJK is a branch of Haplogroup HIJK.

The immediate descendants of IJ are Haplogroup I and Haplogroup J. Its sole sibling is K (which includes most of the world's male population).

Haplogroup IJ derived populations account for a significant proportion of the pre-modern populations of Europe (especially Scandinavia and the Balkans), Anatolia, the Caucasus, the Middle East (especially Arabia, Levant and Mesopotamia) and coastal North Africa. As a result of mass migrations during the modern era, they are now also significant in The Americas and Australasia.

Haplogroup I appears to have arisen in Europe, having been found so far in Palaeolithic sites throughout Europe (Fu 2016), but not outside it. It diverged from the common ancestor IJ* about 43,000 years B.P. (Karafet 2008). Early evidence for haplogroup J has been found in the Caucasus and Iran (Jones 2015, Fu 2016). In addition, living examples of the precursor Haplogroup IJ* have been found only among ethnic groups in modern-day Iran. This may indicate that IJ originated in West Asia.

== Origin ==
A 2008 estimate suggested that the most recent common ancestor of haplogroup IJ could have lived 30,500–46,200 years ago, while another estimate suggests 43,000–45,700 years.

Both of the primary branches of haplogroup IJ – I-M170 and J-M304 – are found among modern populations of the Caucasus, Anatolia, and Southwest Asia. This tends to suggest that Haplogroup IJ branched from IJK in West Asia, Caucasus and/or the Middle East.

Examples of the basal/paragroup Haplogroup IJ* (M429) were first reported in a 2012 study of genetic diversity in Iran, by Grugni et al. These individuals were reported to be positive for M429 and negative for the SNPs M170 and M304, which define haplogroup I and haplogroup J respectively. However, because the researchers filtered for relatively few SNPs, these individuals may have carried less well-known SNPs equivalent to M170 and M304. Given the limited scope of the testing – and the small number of haplogroup IJ samples that were discovered – few firm conclusions have yet been drawn.

An inference may also be made that both IJ (M429) and its sole sibling, Haplogroup K (M9) diverged from the parent Haplogroup IJK closer to the Caucasus and the Middle East than to East Asia, due to the evolutionary distance of IJK from its direct ancestor, haplogroup HIJK.

IJ split in a typically disjunctive, almost mutually-exclusive geographical pattern, with J-M304 far more common in the Caucasus, and I-M170 far more common in Europe; the age of IJ and its subclades suggest that IJ probably entered Europe through the Balkans, some time before the Last Glacial Maximum (about 26,500 years BP). The same geographic corridor (the Balkans) also supported later gene flows, including the Early Neolithic Farmers from Anatolia about 9,000 years BP.

== Phylogeny and distribution ==
IJ (M429, P123, P124, P125, P126, P127, P129, P130, S2, S22, per ISOGG 2008)

- IJ* – found at low frequency in parts of Iran.
  - I (M170, P19, M258, P38, P212, U179, Haplogroup I notation updated to ISOGG 2008; L41, M170, M258, P19_1, P19_2, P19_3, P19_4, P19_5, P38, P212, U179)
    - I* (Observed among Gravettian hunter gatherers)
    - I1 (M253, M307, M450/S109, P30, P40, S62, S63, S64, S65, S66, S107, S108, S110, S111, per ISOGG 2008; also L64, L75, L80, L81, L118, L121/S62, L123, L124/S64, L125/S65, L157.1, L186, L187, L840, M307.2/P203.2) Typical of populations of Scandinavia and Northwest Europe, with a moderate distribution throughout Eastern Europe
      - I1* (unobserved)
      - I-CTS12768 (no phylogenetic name as of 2021)
        - I-CTS12768* – living example in Sweden.
      - I-Z17954 (no phylogenetic name as of 2021)
        - I-Z17954* (unobserved)
        - I-Y21293 – living example in Netherlands.
        - I-Y19092 – living examples in Normandy and Finland.
      - I1a – DF29/S438
          - I1a* - living examples in Sweden, Denmark and Portugal.
          - I1a1 M227
            - I1a1* -
            - I1a1a M72
          - I1a2 L22/S142
            - I1a2* -
            - I1a2a P109
            - I1a2b L205
            - I1a2c L287
              - I1a2c* -
              - I1a2c1 L258/S335
                - I1a2c1* -
                - I1a2c1a L296
            - I1a2d L300/S241
            - I1a2e L813/Z719
          - I1a3 S244/Z58
            - I1a3* -
            - I1a3a S246/Z59
              - I1a3a* -
              - I1a3a1 S337/Z60, S439/Z61, Z62
                - I1a3a1a Z140, Z141
                - I1a3a1a* -
                - I1a3a1a1 L338
                - I1a3a1b Z73
                - I1a3a1c L573
              - I1a3a1d L803
              - I1a3a2 Z382
            - I1a3b S296/Z138, Z139
          - I1a4 S243/Z63
        - I1b Z131
    - I2 (M438/P215/S31) (formerly I1b)
      - I2* (unobserved)
        - I2a (P37.2) (formerly I1b1) Typical of the South Slavic peoples of the Balkans, especially the populations of Bosnia, Croatia, Serbia and Slovenia; also found with high haplotype diversity values, but lower overall frequency, among the West Slavic populations of Slovakia and the Czech Republic; a node of elevated frequency in Moldavia correlates with that observed for Haplogroup I2a (but not for Haplogroup I1)
          - I2a*
          - I2a1 (M423)
            - I2a1*
            - I2a1a (P41.2/M359.2) (formerly I1b1a)
          - I2a2 (M26) (formerly I1b1b) Typical of the population of the so-called "archaic zone" of Sardinia; also found at low frequencies among populations of Southwest Europe, particularly in Castile, Béarn, and the Basque Country
            - I2a2*
            - I2a2a (M161) (formerly I1b1b1)
        - I2b (M436/P214/S33, P216/S30, P217/S23, P218/S32) (formerly I1b2)
          - I2b*
          - I2b1 (M223, P219/S24, P220/S119, P221/S120, P222/U250/S118, P223/S117) (formerly I1b2a - old I1c) Occurs at a moderate frequency among populations of Northwest Europe, with a peak frequency in the region of Lower Saxony in central Germany; minor offshoots appear in Moldavia and Russia (especially around Vladimir, Ryazan, Nizhny Novgorod, and the Republic of Mordovia), and among speakers of Persian (including Iranians, Hazaras in Afghanistan and Pakistan, and Tajiks in Afghanistan)
            - I2b1*
            - I2b1a (M284) (formerly I1b2a1) Generally limited to a low frequency in Great Britain
            - I2b1b (M379) (formerly I1b2a2)
            - I2b1c (P78) (formerly I1b2a3)
            - I2b1d (P95) (formerly I1b2a4)
  - J (12f2.1, M304, S6, S34, S35)
    - J*
    - J1 (M267) Typical of populations of the Middle East, Dagestan and Semitic-speaking populations of North Africa and East Africa
      - J1*
        - J1a (M62)
        - J1b (M365)
        - J1c (M367, M368)
        - J1d (M369)
        - J1e (M390)
        - J2 (M172) Typical of populations of Mesopotamia, Anatolia, Southern Europe, and the Caucasus, with a moderate distribution throughout Southwest Asia, Central Asia, South Asia, and North Africa
      - J2*
        - J2a (M410)
          - J2a*
            - J2a1 (DYS413≤18)
            - J2a2 (M340)
        - J2b (M12, M314, M221; also M102, Z2497, Z2499 Z2500/CTS10660)
          - J2b* At least one living example found in Uzbekistan.
          - J2b1 (M205; includes former J2b1b/J-PF7344)
            - J2b1* Found in ancient remains (3,650 years BP) in Lebanon.
              - J2b1a (YP31, Y3165, Y167062, et al.) Living examples found in Greece and Italy.

== Pseudoscientific theories ==
Some modern Christians, especially Young Earth creationists and proponents of British Israelism, believe that Haplogroup IJ represents the descendants of supposed Biblical figures: either Shem or Japheth (sons of Noah) or Abraham. This contravenes the current consensus that Biblical patriarchal narratives are no longer considered historical, and the central tenets of Young Earth creationism and British Israelism have been refuted by mainstream sources.

== See also ==
- Haplogroup
- Human Y-chromosome DNA haplogroups
- Y-DNA haplogroups in populations of Europe
- Y-DNA haplogroups in populations of South Asia
- Y-DNA haplogroups in populations of East and Southeast Asia
- Y-DNA haplogroups in populations of the Near East
- Y-DNA haplogroups in populations of North Africa
- Y-DNA haplogroups in populations of the Caucasus
- Y-DNA haplogroups by ethnic group
- Haplogroup I
- Haplogroup I1
- Haplogroup I2
- Haplogroup J
- Haplogroup J2
