= Haplogroup H =

Haplogroup H may refer to:

- Haplogroup H (mtDNA), i.e. human mitochondrial DNA
- Haplogroup H (Y-DNA), i.e. human Y-chromosome DNA
