= Haplogroup IJK =

Human Y-chromosome DNA haplogroup

- Possible time of origin: 55,000 BP
- Coalescence age: 52,900-54,100 BP
- Possible place of origin: Eurasia
- Ancestor: Haplogroup HIJK
- Descendants: IJ, K
- Defining mutations: L15/S137, L16/S138, L69.1(=G)/S163.1

Haplogroup IJK is a human Y-chromosome DNA haplogroup. IJK is a primary branch of the macrohaplogroup HIJK. Its direct descendants are haplogroup IJ and haplogroup K.

== Distribution and structure ==
IJK has not been reported in modern populations or in ancient human remains. Previously, basal paragroup HIJK* was reported in a Mesolithic European (Magdalenian), GoyetQ-2, and Upper Paleolithic European (Gravettian), Vestonice16. However, in a later study in 2023 with high quality sequencing of Magdalenian, GoyetQ-2, Gravettian, Vestonice16, the ancient human remains were assigned with Haplogroup I.

Populations with high proportions of males who belong to descendant major haplogroups of Haplogroup HIJK live across widely dispersed areas and populations. Subclades of IJK are now concentrated in males native to:

- Europe (e. g. haplogroups I, J, R and N);
- the Caucasus, Near East and North East Africa (e.g. haplogroups J and T);
- South Asia (e.g. haplogroups J, L and R);
- East Asia，Southeast Asia, Oceania, and the Pacific (e. g. haplogroups K, M, O, P, S)
- Northern Eurasia, (e.g. haplogroups N and Q) and;
- Native American peoples (e. g. haplogroup Q and R).

=== Structure ===
==== Basic phylogeny ====
- IJK
  - IJK (L15/S137, L16/S138, L69.1(=G)/S163.1)
    - IJ (M429/P125, P123, P124, P126, P127, P129, P130, S2, S22)
    - K (M9, P128, P131, P132)

==== Phylogenetic tree ====
- Haplogroup IJK†
  - IJ
    - I
      - I1 found mainly in Northern Europe.
      - I2found mainly in South-Eastern Europe
    - J
      - J1 found mainly in the Caucasus and Middle East.
      - J2 found mainly in the Caucasus, Western Asia, Near East, Central Asia, South Asia and Southern Europe.
  - K†
    - LT†
      - L found mainly in Central Asia, South Asia and Western Asia.
      - T now concentrated in the Horn of Africa, the Arabian subcontinent, India and Eurasia.
    - K2
      - K2* – the basal subclade is found at significant levels among indigenous Australians. Also found at Mandar and Toba Batak one of the Indigenous Tribe in Sundaland.
      - NO* † (found only in the remains of Ust'-Ishim man,<br /> dating from 45,000 BP) → NO1 (K2a)
        - NO1* †
        - N found mainly in Northern Asia and Northern Europe.
        - O found mainly in East Asia, Southeast Asia, and Oceania.
      - K2b†
        - K2b1*† – subclades of K2b1 include the major haplogroups M and S; these are now found mainly among Papuan peoples, Micronesian peoples, indigenous Australians, and Polynesians
        - P (K2b2)
          - P* rare; found mostly in Island South East Asia, Eastern Siberia and Central Asia
          - P1 – the primary subclades are major haplogroups Q and R, which are now numerically dominant in Central Asia, Europe, South Asia, the Middle East and among Native Americans
          - P2 extremely rare and found only in the Philippines
      - K2c – rare lineage, found mainly in males from Bali
      - K2d – rare lineage, found mainly in Java
      - K2e – rare lineage, found only in two living males from South India

† = A basal haplogroup that has not been documented among living individuals.

(Based on the YCC 2008 tree and subsequent published research.)

== Mutation ==
=== L15 ===
The defining SNP L15 is located at Y chromosomal location rs9786139 with the ancestral value being A and the derived value being G.

=== L16 ===
The defining SNP L16 is at location rs9786714 with the ancestral value being G and the derived value being A.

== See also ==
- Haplogroup
- Human Y-chromosome DNA haplogroups
- Y-chromosome haplogroups in populations of the world
- Y-DNA haplogroups in populations of Europe
- Y-DNA haplogroups in populations of South Asia
- Y-DNA haplogroups in populations of East and Southeast Asia
- Y-DNA haplogroups in populations of the Near East
- Y-DNA haplogroups in populations of North Africa
- Y-DNA haplogroups in populations of the Caucasus
- Y-DNA haplogroups by ethnic group
- Haplogroup IJ (Y-DNA)
- Haplogroup I (Y-DNA)
- Haplogroup J (Y-DNA)
- Haplogroup K (Y-DNA)
