= Haplogroup J (Y-DNA) =

Human Y-chromosome DNA haplogroup

Haplogroup J-M304
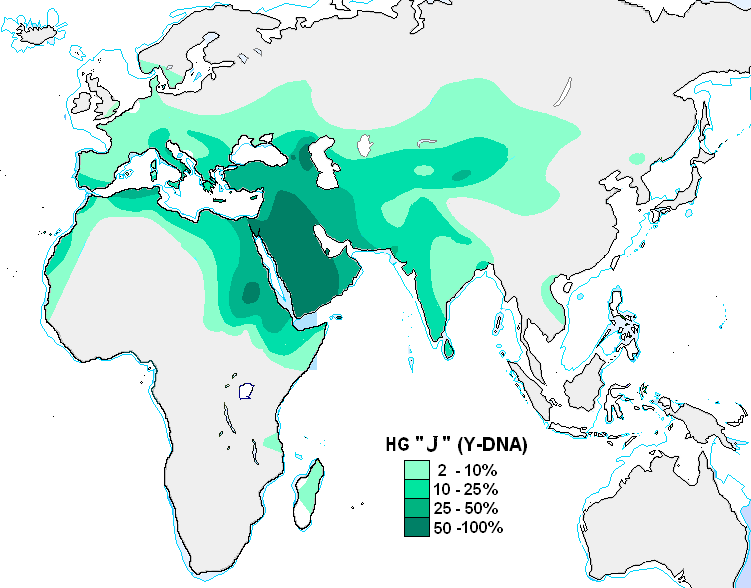
- Possible time of origin: 42,900 years ago
- Coalescence age: 31,600 years ago
- Possible place of origin: West Asia
- Ancestor: IJ
- Descendants: J-M267, J-M172
- Defining mutations: M304/Page16/PF4609, 12f2.1
- Highest frequencies: Ingush, Chechens, Avars, Lezgins, Dargins, Arabs, Indians, Pashtuns, Sudanese, Nubians, Punjabis, Parsis, Dravidians, Balochis, Persians, Kurds, Assyrians, Jews, Turks, Greeks, Georgians, Mandeans, Italians, Cypriots, Turkmens

Haplogroup J-M304, also known as J, (Note: ISOGG Y-DNA Haplogroup J and its Subclades - 2016 (2 February 2016).) is a human Y-chromosome DNA haplogroup. It is believed to have evolved in the Caucasus or Iran. The clade spread from there during the Neolithic, primarily into North Africa, the Horn of Africa, the Socotra Archipelago, Europe, Anatolia, Central Asia, South Asia, and Southeast Asia.

Haplogroup J-M304 is divided into two main subclades (branches), J-M267 and J-M172.

== Origins ==
Haplogroup J-M304 is believed to have split from haplogroup I-M170 roughly 43,000 years ago in Western Asia, as both lineages are haplogroup IJ subclades. Haplogroup IJ and haplogroup K derive from haplogroup IJK, and only at this level of classification does haplogroup IJK join with Haplogroup G-M201 and Haplogroup H as immediate descendants of Haplogroup F-M89. J-M304 (Transcaucasian origin) is defined by the M304 genetic marker, or the equivalent 12f2.1 marker. The main current subgroups J-M267 (Armenian highlands origin) and J-M172 (Zagros mountains origin), which now comprise between them almost all of the haplogroup's descendant lineages, are both believed to have arisen very early, at least 10,000 years ago. Nonetheless, Y-chromosomes F-M89* and IJ-M429* were reported to have been observed in the Iranian plateau (Grugni et al. 2012).

On the other hand, it would seem to be that different episodes of populace movement had impacted southeast Europe, as well as the role of the Balkans as a long-standing corridor to Europe from the Near East is shown by the phylogenetic unification of Hgs I and J by the basal M429 mutation. This proof of common ancestry suggests that ancestral Hgs IJ-M429* probably would have entered Europe through the Balkan track sometime before the LGM. They then subsequently split into Hg J and Hg I in Middle East and Europe in a typical disjunctive phylogeographic pattern. Such a geographic hall is prone to have encountered extra consequent gene streams, including the horticultural settlers. Moreover, the unification of haplogroups IJK creates evolutionary distance from F–H delegates, as well as supporting the inference that both IJ-M429 and KT-M9 arose closer to the Middle East than Central or East Asia.

Haplogroup J has also been found among two ancient Hyksos-related mummies excavated at the Abusir el-Meleq archaeological site in Middle Egypt, which date from a period between the late New Kingdom and the Roman era.

== Distribution ==
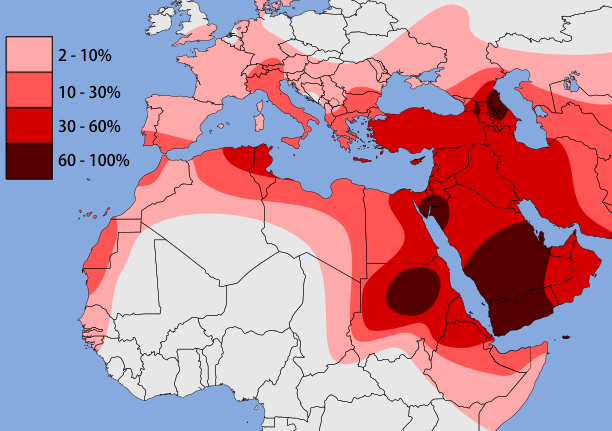
Haplogroup J (Y-DNA) Map on Egypt and the surrounding region. Connecting to the Middle East and Northern Medditeranean.

Haplogroup J-M267 is found in its greatest concentration in the Caucasus where it is believed to have formed. Outside of this region, haplogroup J-M304 has a significant presence in other parts of the Middle East as well as in North Africa, the Horn of Africa, and the Arabian peninsula. It also has a moderate occurrence in Southern Europe, especially in central and southern Italy, Malta, Greece and Albania. The J-M410 subclade is mostly distributed in Asia Minor, Greece and southern Italy. Additionally, J-M304 is observed in Central Asia and South Asia, particularly in the form of its subclade J-M172. J-12f2 and J-P19 are also found among the Herero (8%).

Country/Region	Sampling	N	J-M267	J-M172	Total J	Study
Algeria	Oran	102	22.5	4.9	27.4	Robino 2008
Albania	Tirana	30			20.0	Bosch 2006
Albania		55			23.64	Battaglia 2008
Bosnia	Serbs	81			9.9	Battaglia 2008
North Caucasus	Chechen	330	20.9	56.7	77.6	Balanovsky 2011
North Caucasus	Ingush	143	2.8	88.8	91.6	Balanovsky 2011
North Caucasus	Lezgin	290	63	6	69	Agdzhoyan 2023
China	Uygur	50	0	34.0	34.0	Shou 2010
China	Uzbek	23	0	30.4	34.7	Shou 2010
China	Tajik	31	0	16.1	16.1	Shou 2010
China	Han Chinese	30		10	10	Xue 2006
Cyprus		164	9.6	12.9	22.5	El-Sibai 2009
Egypt		124	19.8	7.6	27.4	El-Sibai 2009
Greece	Crete/Heraklion	104	1.9	44.2	46.1	Martinez 2007
Greece	Crete	143	3.5	35	38.5	El-Sibai 2009
Greece		154	1.9	18.1	20	El-Sibai 2009
India	Sunni and North Indian Shia	112	32	43.2	75.2	El-Sibai 2009
Iran		92	3.2	25	28.2	El-Sibai 2009
Iraq	Arab and Assyrian	117	33.1	25.1	58.2	El-Sibai 2009
Israel	Akko (Arabs)	101	39.2	18.6	57.8	El-Sibai 2009
Italy		699	2	20	22	Capelli 2007
Italy	Central Marche	59	5.1	35.6	40.7	Capelli 2007
Italy	West Calabria	57	3.5	35.1	38.6	Capelli 2007
Italy	Sicily	212	5.2	22.6	27.8	El-Sibai 2009
Italy	Sardinia	81	4.9	9.9	14.8	El-Sibai 2009
Jordan		273	35.5	14.6	50.1	El-Sibai 2009
Kosovo	Albanians	114			16.67	Pericić 2005
Kuwait		42	33.3	9.5	42.8	El-Sibai 2009
Lebanon		951	17	29.4	46.4	El-Sibai 2009
Malta		90	7.8	21.1	28.9	El-Sibai 2009
Morocco		316	1	0.2	1.2	El-Sibai 2009
Morocco	Residents in Italy	51	19.6	0	19.6	Onofri 2008
Portugal	Portugal	303	4.3	6.9	11.2	El-Sibai 2009
Qatar	Qatar	72	58.3	8.3	66.6	El-Sibai 2009
Saudi Arabia		157	40.13	15.92	57.96	Abu-Amero 2009
Serbia	Belgrade	113			8	Pericić 2005
Serbia		179			5.6	Mirabal 2010
Spain	Cadiz	28	3.6	14.3	17.9	El-Sibai 2009
Spain	Cantabria	70	2.9	2.9	5.8	El-Sibai 2009
Spain	Castille	21	0	9.5	9.5	El-Sibai 2009
Spain	Cordoba	27	0	14.7	14.7	El-Sibai 2009
Spain	Galicia	19	5.3	0	5.3	El-Sibai 2009
Spain	Huelva	22	0	13.7	13.7	El-Sibai 2009
Spain	Ibiza	54	0	3.7	3.7	El-Sibai 2009
Spain	Leon	60	1.7	5	6.7	El-Sibai 2009
Spain	Malaga	26	0	15.4	15.4	El-Sibai 2009
Spain	Mallorca	62	1.6	8	9.7	El-Sibai 2009
Spain	Sevilla	155	3.2	7.8	11	El-Sibai 2009
Spain	Valencia	31	2.7	5.5	8.2	El-Sibai 2009
Syria	Arab and Assyrian	554	33.6	20.8	54.4	El-Sibai 2009
Tunisia		62	0	8	8	El-Sibai 2009
Tunisia		52	34.6	3.8	38.4	Onofri 2008
Tunisia	Sousse	220	25.9	8.2	34.1	Fadhlaoui-Zid 2014
Tunisia	Tunis	148	32.4	3.4	35.8	Arredi 2004
Turkey		523	9.1	24.2	33.3	El-Sibai 2009
UAE		164	34.7	10.3	45	El-Sibai 2009
Yemen		62	72.5	9.6	82.1	El-Sibai 2009

=== Subclade distribution ===
==== J-M304* ====
Paragroup J-M304* (Note: This table shows the historic names for J-M304 (a.k.a. J-P209, and J-12f2.1) in published peer reviewed literature. Note that in Semino 2000 Eu09 is a subclade of Eu10 and in Karafet 2001 24 is a subclade of 23.: YCC 2002/2008 (Shorthand) / J-M304 (a.k.a. J-12f2.1 or J-P209); Jobling and Tyler-Smith 2000 / 9; Underhill 2000 / VI; Hammer 2001 / Med; Karafet 2001 / 23; Semino 2000 / Eu10; Su 1999 / H4; Capelli 2001 / B; YCC 2002 (Longhand) / J*; YCC 2005 (Longhand) / J; YCC 2008 (Longhand) / J; YCC 2010r (Longhand) / J) includes all of J-M304 except for J-M267, J-M172 and their subclades. J-M304* is rarely found outside of the island of Socotra, belonging to Yemen, where it is extremely frequent at 71.4% and j1-267 for the rest with no j2 Haplogroup J-M304* also has been found with lower frequency in Oman (Di Giacomo 2004), Ashkenazi Jews, Saudi Arabia (Abu-Amero 2009), Greece (Di Giacomo 2004), the Czech Republic (Di Giacomo 2004 and Luca 2007), Uygurs and several Turkic peoples. (Cinnioglu 2004 and Varzari 2006).

YFull and FTDNA have however failed to find J* people anywhere in the world although there are 2 J2-Y130506 persons and 1 J1 person from Soqotra. But Cerny 2009 study found 9 J1 persons in Soqotra/Socotra and majority of J* and no J2, hypothesizing a J1 founder effect in Socotra.

The following gives a summary of most of the studies which specifically tested for J-M267 and J-M172, showing its distribution in Europe, North Africa, the Middle East and Central Asia.

==== J-M267 ====
The marker J-M267 (Note: This table shows the historic names for J-M267 and its earlier discovered and named subclade J-M62 in published peer reviewed literature.: YCC 2002/2008 (Shorthand) / J-M267 / J-M62; Jobling and Tyler-Smith 2000 / - / 9; Underhill 2000 / - / VI; Hammer 2001 / - / Med; Karafet 2001 / - / 23; Semino 2000 / - / Eu10; Su 1999 / - / H4; Capelli 2001 / - / B; YCC 2002 (Longhand) / - / J1; YCC 2005 (Longhand) / J1 / J1a; YCC 2008 (Longhand) / J1 / J1a; YCC 2010r (Longhand) / J1 / J1a) defined by the M267 SNP is in modern times most frequent in the Arabian Peninsula: Yemen (up to 76%), Saudi (up to 64%) (Alshamali 2009), Qatar (58%), and Dagestan (up to 56%). J-M267 is generally frequent among Arab Bedouins (62%), Ashkenazi Jews (20%) (Semino 2004), Algeria (up to 35%) (Semino 2004), Iraq (28%) (Semino 2004), Tunisia (up to 31%), Syria (up to 30%), Egypt (up to 20%) (Luis 2004), and the Sinai Peninsula. To some extent, the frequency of Haplogroup J-M267 collapses at the borders of Arabic/Semitic-speaking territories with mainly non-Arabic/Semitic speaking territories, such as Turkey (9%), Iran (5%), Sunni Indian Muslims (2.3%) and Northern Indian Shia (11%) (Eaaswarkhanth 2009). Some figures above tend to be the larger ones obtained in some studies, while the smaller figures obtained in other studies are omitted. It is also highly frequent among Jews, especially the Kohanim line (46%) (Hammer 2009).

ISOGG states that J-M267 originated in the Middle East. It is found in parts of the Near East, Anatolia and North Africa, with a much sparser distribution in the southern Mediterranean flank of Europe, and in Ethiopia.

The origin of the J-P58 subclade is the Caucasus and then spreads southward into the Arabian Peninsula. The high Y-STR variance of J-P58 in ethnic groups in Turkey, as well as northern regions in Syria and Iraq, supports the inference of an origin of J-P58 in nearby eastern Anatolia. Moreover, the network analysis of J-P58 haplotypes shows that some of the populations with low diversity, such as Bedouins from Israel, Qatar, Sudan and the United Arab Emirates, are tightly clustered near high-frequency haplotypes. This suggests that founder effects with star burst expansion into the Arabian Desert (Chiaroni 2010).

==== J-M172 ====
The marker J-M172 (Note: This table shows the historic names for J-M172 in published peer reviewed literature. Note that in Semino 2000 Eu09 is a subclade of Eu10 and in Karafet 2001 24 is a subclade of 23.: YCC 2002/2008 (Shorthand) / J-M172; Jobling and Tyler-Smith 2000 / 9; Underhill 2000 / VI; Hammer 2001 / Med; Karafet 2001 / 24; Semino 2000 / Eu9; Su 1999 / H4; Capelli 2001 / B; YCC 2002 (Longhand) / J2*; YCC 2005 (Longhand) / J2; YCC 2008 (Longhand) / J2; YCC 2010r (Longhand) / J2) is found in the highest concentrations in the Caucasus and the Fertile Crescent/Iraq and is found throughout the Mediterranean (including the Italian, Balkan, Anatolian and Iberian peninsulas and North Africa) (Di Giacomo 2003).

The highest ever reported concentration of J-M172 was 72% in Northeastern Georgia (Nasidze 2004). Other high reports include Ingush 32% (Nasidze 2004), Cypriots 30-37% (Capelli 2005), Lebanese 30% (Wells et al. 2001), Assyrian, Mandean and Arab Iraqis 29.7% (Sanchez et al. 2005), Syrians 22.5%, Kurds 24%-28%, Pashtuns 20-30%,Iranians 23% (Aburto 2006), Ashkenazi Jews 24%, Palestinian Arabs 16.8%-25%, Sephardic Jews 29% and North Indian Shia Muslim 18%, Chechens 26%, Balkars 24%, Yaghnobis 32%, Armenians 21-24%, and Azerbaijanis 24%-48%.

In South Asia, J2-M172 was found to be significantly higher among Dravidian castes at 19% than among Indo-European castes at 11%. J2-M172 and J-M410 is found 21% among Dravidian middle castes, followed by upper castes, 18.6%, and lower castes 14%. (Sengupta 2006) Subclades of M172 such as M67 and M92 were not found in either Indian or Pakistani samples which also might hint at a partial common origin.(Sengupta 2006)

According to a genetic study in China by Shou et al., J2-M172 is found with high frequency among Uygurs (17/50 = 34%) and Uzbeks (7/23 = 30.4%), moderate frequency among Pamiris (5/31 = 16.1%), and also found J-M172 in Han Chinese (10%) and low frequency among Yugurs (2/32 = 6.3%) and Monguors (1/50 = 2.0%). The authors also found J-M304(xJ2-M172) with low frequency among the Russians (1/19 = 5.3%), Uzbeks (1/23 = 4.3%), Sibe people (1/32 = 3.1%), Dongxiangs (1/35 = 2.9%), and Kazakhs (1/41 = 2.4%) in Northwest China. Only far northwestern ethnic minorities had haplogroup J in Xinjiang, China. Uzbeks in the sample had 30.4% J2-M172 and Tajiks of Xinjiang and Uyghurs also had it.

== Phylogenetics ==
In Y-chromosome phylogenetics, subclades are the branches of haplogroups. These subclades are also defined by single nucleotide polymorphisms (SNPs) or unique event polymorphisms (UEPs).

=== Phylogenetic history ===
Before 2002, the academic literature featured at least seven different naming systems for the Y-Chromosome phylogenetic tree, resulting in significant confusion. To address this, the major research groups united in 2002 to establish the Y-Chromosome Consortium (YCC). They published a joint paper that created a single new tree that all agreed to use. Later, a group of amateur scientists with an interest in population genetics and genetic genealogy formed a working group to create the phylogenetic tree below. The table below brings together all of these works at the point of the landmark 2002 YCC Tree. This allows a researcher reviewing older published literature to quickly move between nomenclatures.

YCC 2002/2008 (Shorthand)	(α)	(β)	(γ)	(δ)	(ε)	(ζ)	(η)	YCC 2002 (Longhand)	YCC 2005 (Longhand)	YCC 2008 (Longhand)	YCC 2010r (Longhand)	ISOGG 2006	ISOGG 2007	ISOGG 2008	ISOGG 2009	ISOGG 2010	ISOGG 2011	ISOGG 2012
J-12f2a	9	VI	Med	23	Eu10	H4	B	J*	J	J	J	-	-	-	-	-	-	J
J-M62	9	VI	Med	23	Eu10	H4	B	J1	J1a	J1a	J1a	-	-	-	-	-	-	Private
J-M172	9	VI	Med	24	Eu9	H4	B	J2*	J2	J2	J2	-	-	-	-	-	-	J2
J-M47	9	VI	Med	24	Eu9	H4	B	J2a	J2a	J2a1	J2a4a	-	-	-	-	-	-	J2a1a
J-M68	9	VI	Med	24	Eu9	H4	B	J2b	J2b	J2a3	J2a4c	-	-	-	-	-	-	J2a1c
J-M137	9	VI	Med	24	Eu9	H4	B	J2c	J2c	J2a4	J2a4h2a1	-	-	-	-	-	-	J2a1h2a1a
J-M158	9	VI	Med	24	Eu9	H4	B	J2d	J2d	J2a5	J2a4h1	-	-	-	-	-	-	J2a1h1
J-M12	9	VI	Med	24	Eu9	H4	B	J2e*	J2e	J2b	J2b	-	-	-	-	-	-	J2b
J-M102	9	VI	Med	24	Eu9	H4	B	J2e1*	J2e1	J2b	J2b	-	-	-	-	-	-	J2b
J-M99	9	VI	Med	24	Eu9	H4	B	J2e1a	J2e1a	J2b2a	J2b2a	-	-	-	-	-	-	Private
J-M67	9	VI	Med	24	Eu9	H4	B	J2f*	J2f	J2a2	J2a4b	-	-	-	-	-	-	J2a1b
J-M92	9	VI	Med	24	Eu9	H4	B	J2f1	J2f1	J2a2a	J2a4b1	-	-	-	-	-	-	J2a1b1
J-M163	9	VI	Med	24	Eu9	H4	B	J2f2	J2f2	J2a2b	J2a4b2	-	-	-	-	-	-	Private

==== Research publications ====
The following research teams per their publications were represented in the creation of the YCC tree.

- α Jobling and Tyler-Smith 2000 and Kaladjieva 2001
- β Underhill 2000
- γ Hammer 2001
- δ Karafet 2001
- ε Semino 2000
- ζ Su 1999
- η Capelli 2001

=== Phylogenetic trees ===
There are several confirmed and proposed phylogenetic trees available for haplogroup J-M304. The scientifically accepted one is the Y-Chromosome Consortium (YCC) one published in Karafet 2008 and subsequently updated. A draft tree that shows emerging science is provided by Thomas Krahn at the Genomic Research Center in Houston, Texas. The International Society of Genetic Genealogy (ISOGG) also provides an amateur tree.

==== The Genomic Research Center draft tree ====
This is Thomas Krahn at the Genomic Research Center's Draft tree Proposed Tree for haplogroup J-P209 (Krahn & FTDNA 2013). For brevity, only the first three levels of subclades are shown.

- J-M304 12f2a, 12f2.1, M304, P209, L60, L134
  - M267, L255, L321, L765, L814, L827, L1030
    - M62
    - M365.1
    - L136, L572, L620
      - M390
      - P56
      - P58, L815, L828
      - L256
    - Z1828, Z1829, Z1832, Z1833, Z1834, Z1836, Z1839, Z1840, Z1841, Z1843, Z1844
      - Z1842
      - L972
  - M172, L228
    - M410, L152, L212, L505, L532, L559
      - M289
      - L26, L27, L927
      - L581
    - M12, M102, M221, M314, L282
      - M205
      - M241

==== The Y-Chromosome Consortium tree ====
This is the official scientific tree produced by the Y-Chromosome Consortium (YCC). The last major update was in 2008 (Karafet 2008). Subsequent updates have been quarterly and biannual. The current (2022) version is of the 2019/2020 update.

== Prominent members of J ==
- Ali ibn Abi Talib
- Saddam Hussein
- Ben Affleck
- Edgar Allan Poe
- Qajar dynasty
- Khabib Nurmagomedov
- House of Saud
- Vincent van Gogh
- Rothschild family
- Dustin Hoffman
- Bernard Montgomery
- John Stamos
- Bernie Sanders
- Dzhokhar Dudayev
- Adam Sandler

== See also ==
=== Genetics ===
- Genetic history of the Middle East
- Genetic history of Europe
- Genetics and archaeogenetics of South Asia
- Conversion table for Y chromosome haplogroups
- Genetic Genealogy
- Haplogroup
- Haplotype
- Human Y-chromosome DNA haplogroup
- Molecular Phylogeny
- Paragroup
- Subclade
- Y-chromosomal Aaron
- Y-chromosome haplogroups in populations of the world
- Y-DNA haplogroups in populations of Europe
- Y-DNA haplogroups in populations of South Asia
- Y-DNA haplogroups in populations of East and Southeast Asia
- Y-DNA haplogroups in populations of the Near East
- Y-DNA haplogroups in populations of North Africa
- Y-DNA haplogroups in populations of the Caucasus
- Y-DNA haplogroups by ethnic group

=== Y-DNA J subclades ===
- J-P58
- J-M304
- J-M172
- J-M267
- J2-L24
- J2-L192
- J2-L271

YCC 2002/2008 (Shorthand)	J-M304 (a.k.a. J-12f2.1 or J-P209)
Jobling and Tyler-Smith 2000	9
Underhill 2000	VI
Hammer 2001	Med
Karafet 2001	23
Semino 2000	Eu10
Su 1999	H4
Capelli 2001	B
YCC 2002 (Longhand)	J*
YCC 2005 (Longhand)	J
YCC 2008 (Longhand)	J
YCC 2010r (Longhand)	J

YCC 2002/2008 (Shorthand)	J-M267	J-M62
Jobling and Tyler-Smith 2000	-	9
Underhill 2000	-	VI
Hammer 2001	-	Med
Karafet 2001	-	23
Semino 2000	-	Eu10
Su 1999	-	H4
Capelli 2001	-	B
YCC 2002 (Longhand)	-	J1
YCC 2005 (Longhand)	J1	J1a
YCC 2008 (Longhand)	J1	J1a
YCC 2010r (Longhand)	J1	J1a

YCC 2002/2008 (Shorthand)	J-M172
Jobling and Tyler-Smith 2000	9
Underhill 2000	VI
Hammer 2001	Med
Karafet 2001	24
Semino 2000	Eu9
Su 1999	H4
Capelli 2001	B
YCC 2002 (Longhand)	J2*
YCC 2005 (Longhand)	J2
YCC 2008 (Longhand)	J2
YCC 2010r (Longhand)	J2
