= Haplogroup J-M172 =

Human Y-chromosome DNA haplogroup

Haplogroup J2
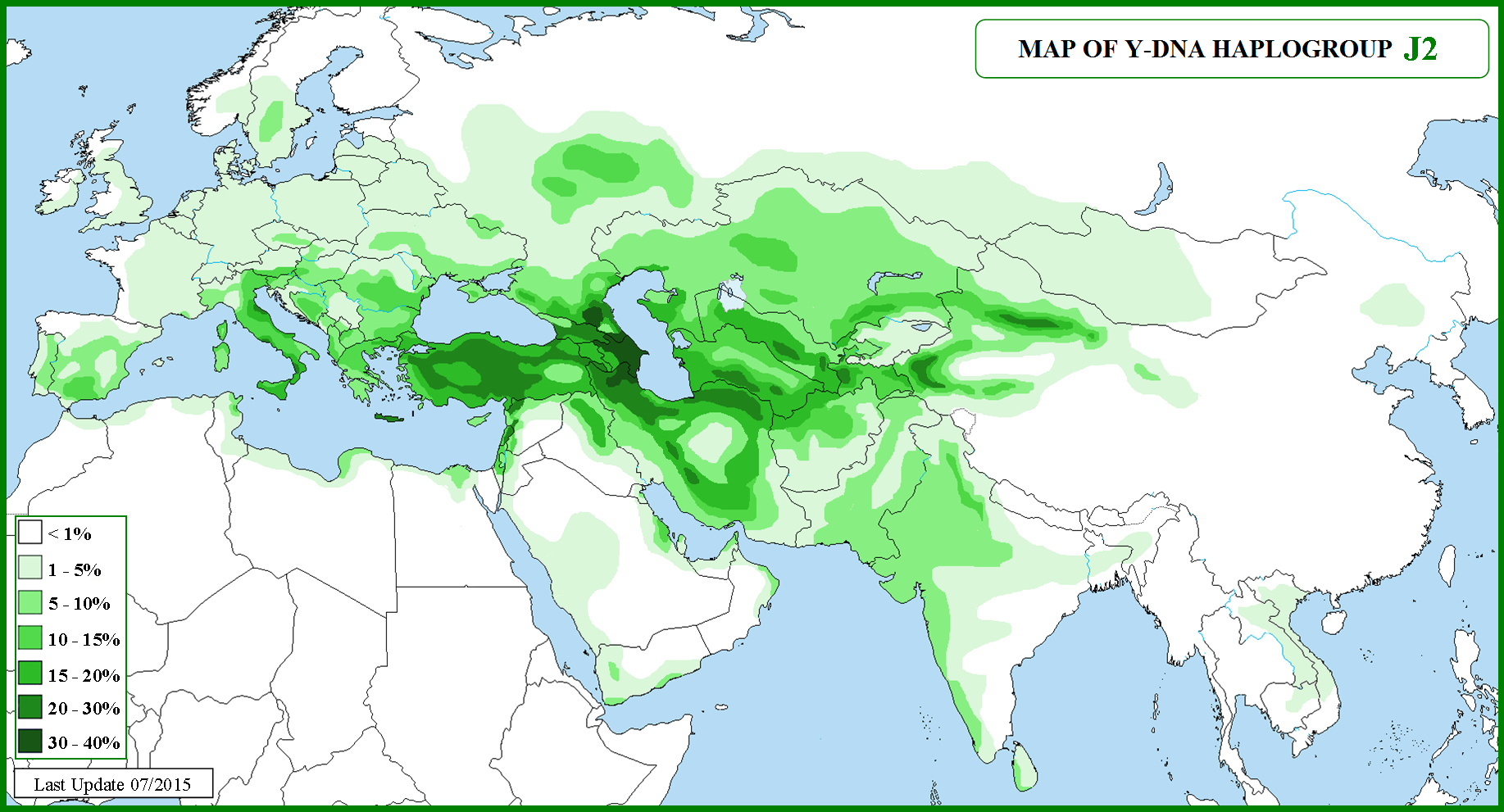
- Possible time of origin: 32000 ybp
- Coalescence age: 28000 ybp
- Possible place of origin: Caucasus. (Note: "The extent of differentiation of Hg J, observed both with the biallelic and microsatellite markers, points to the Middle East as its likely homeland. In this area, J-M172 and J-M267 are equally represented and show the highest degree of internal variation, indicating that it is most likely that these subclades also arose in the Middle East.")
- Ancestor: J-P209
- Defining mutations: M172
- Highest frequencies: Ingush 88.8%, Chechens 56.7%, Georgians 21%-72%, Azerbaijanis 24%-48%, Cretans 35%, Uyghurs 34%, Iranians 22.5%-45%, Yaghnobis 32%, Turks 24%-40%, Uzbeks 30.4%, Lebanese 30%, Palestinians 29%, Greeks 10%-48%, Muslim Kurds 28.4%, Bahrainis 27.6%, Ashkenazi Jews 24-30%, Hazara 26.6%, Kuwaiti 26%, Abkhaz 25%, Cypriots 12.9%-37%, Iraqis 24%-25%, Balkars 24%, Armenians 21%-24%, Italians 9%-36%, Sephardi Jews 15-29%, Circassians 21.8%, Syrians 14%-29%, Maltese 21%, Lemba 20.8%, Ossetians 16%-24%, Lipka Tatars 18.9 %, North Indian Shia Muslims 18%, Albanians 16%, Mordvins 15.3%, Volga Tatars 15.1% (Kazan Tatars 8.9%, Mishar Tatars 26.38%), Chuvash 14%, Kalash people 9.1%. (Note: A genetic study on Kalash individuals found high and diverse frequencies.)

In human genetics, Haplogroup J-M172 or J2 (Note: This table shows the historic names for J-M172 in published peer reviewed literature. Note that in Semino 2000 Eu09 is a subclade of Eu10 and in Karafet 2001 24 is a subclade of 23.: YCC 2002/2008 (Shorthand) / J-M172; Jobling & Tyler-Smith 2000 / 9; Underhill 2000 / VI; Hammer 2001 / Med; Karafet 2001 / 24; Semino 2000 / Eu9; Su 1999 / H4; Capelli 2001 / B; YCC 2002 (Longhand) / J2*; YCC 2005 (Longhand) / J2; YCC 2008 (Longhand) / J2; YCC 2010r (Longhand) / J2) is a Y-chromosome haplogroup which is a subclade (branch) of haplogroup J-M304. (Note: This table shows the historic names for J-P209 (AKA J-12f2.1 or J-M304) in published peer reviewed literature. Note that in Semino 2000 Eu09 is a subclade of Eu10 and in Karafet 2001 24 is a subclade of 23.: YCC 2002/2008 (Shorthand) / J-P209 (AKA J-12f2.1 or J-M304); Jobling & Tyler-Smith 2000 / 9; Underhill 2000 / VI; Hammer 2001 / Med; Karafet 2001 / 23; Semino 2000 / Eu10; Su 1999 / H4; Capelli 2001 / B; YCC 2002 (Longhand) / J*; YCC 2005 (Longhand) / J; YCC 2008 (Longhand) / J; YCC 2010r (Longhand) / J) Haplogroup J-M172 is common in modern populations in Western Asia, Central Asia, South Asia, Southern Europe, Northwestern Iran and North Africa. It is thought that J-M172 may have originated in the Caucasus, Anatolia, Mesopotamia and/or present-day Western Iran.

It is further divided into two complementary clades, J-M410 and J-M12 (M12, M102, M221, M314).

== Origins ==
The date of origin for haplogroup J-M172 was estimated by Batini et al in 2015 as between 19,000 and 24,000 years before present (BP). Samino et al in 2004 dated the origin of the parent haplogroup, J-P209, to between 18,900 and 44,500 YBP. Ancient J-M410, specifically subclade J-Y12379*, has been found, in a Mesolithic context, in a tooth from the Kotias Klde Cave in western Georgia from the Late Upper Palaeolithic (13,300 years old) and the Mesolithic (9,700 years old) This sample has been assigned to the Caucasus hunter-gatherers (CHG) autosomal component. J-M410, more specifically its subclade J-PF5008, has also been found in a Mesolithic sample from the Hotu and Kamarband Caves located in Mazandaran Province of Iran, dating back to 9,100-8,600 B.C.E (approximately 11,000 ybp). Both samples belong to the Trialetian Culture. This confirms that haplogroup J2 was already present in the Caucasus and the southern Caspian region during the Mesolithic period.. The earliest Neolithic appearances of haplogroup J2 occurred in the form of a J2b sample from Tepe Abdul Hosein (8000 BC) in northwestern Iran, and J2a from the sites of Çayönü (7500 BC) in southeastern Anatolia and Barcın (6500–6200 BC) in northwestern Anatolia.

Zalloua & Wells (2004) and Al-Zahery et al. (2003) claimed to have uncovered the earliest known migration of J2, expanded possibly from Anatolia and the Caucasus. Nebel et al. (2001) found that, "According to Underhill et al. (2000), Eu 9 (H58) evolved from Eu 10 (H71) through a T→G transversion at M172 (emphasis added)," and that in today's populations, Eu 9 (the post-mutation form of M172) is strongest in the Caucasus, Asia Minor and the Levant, whilst Eu 10 becomes stronger and replaces the frequency of Eu 9 as one moves south into the Arabian Peninsula, so that people from the Caucasus met with Arabs near and between Mesopotamia (Sumer/Assyria) and the Negev Desert, as "Arabisation" spread from Arabia to the Fertile Crescent and Turkey.

Di Giacomo et al. (2004) postulated that J-M172 haplogroup spread into Southern Europe from either the Levant or Anatolia, likely parallel to the development of agriculture. As to the timing of its spread into Europe, Di Giacomo et al. points to events which post-date the Neolithic, in particular the demographic floruit associated with the rise of the Ancient Greek world. Semino et al. (2004) derived older age estimates for overall J2 (having used the Zhivotovsky method c.f. Di Giacomo), postulating its initial spread with Neolithic farmers from the Near East. However, its subclade distribution, showing localized peaks in the Southern Balkans, southern Italy, north/central Italy and the Caucasus, does not conform to a single 'wave-of-advance' scenario, betraying a number of still poorly understood post-Neolithic processes which created its current pattern. Like Di Giacomo et al., the Bronze Age southern Balkans was suggested by Semino et al. to have been an important vector of spread.

== Distribution ==
Haplogroup J-M172 is found mainly in the Fertile Crescent, the Caucasus, Anatolia, Italy, the Mediterranean littoral, and the Iranian plateau. Y-DNA: J2 (J-M172): Syrid/Nahrainid Arabid(s).

The highest reported frequency of J-M172 ever was 87.4%, among Ingush in Malgobek.

Generally it is found in the North Caucasus, Georgia, Azerbaijan, Iran, Turkey, Lebanon, Palestine, Greece (especially Crete), Israel, Kuwait, Cyprus, Iraq, Armenia, Italy, Syria, Albania, Spain and more specifically in Chechens 51.0%–58.0%, Georgians 21%–72%, Lebanese 30%, Bahrainis 27.6%, Turks 13%–40%, Cypriots 12.9%–37%, Iraqis 24%, Ossetians 24%, Balkars 24%, Syrians 23%,, Sephardi Jews 15%–29%, Italians 9%–36%, Armenians 21%–24%, Circassians 21.8%, Maltese 21%, North Indian Shia Muslim 18%. Iranians 10%–25%, Palestinians 17%, Albanians 16%, Assyrians 15%, Saudis 14%, Jordanians 14% and Omanis 10%–15%.

=== North Africa ===
Country/Region	Sampling	N	J-M172	Study
Tunisia	Tunisia	62	8	El-Sibai et al. 2009
Tunisia	Sousse	220	8.2	Fadhlaoui-Zid 2014
Algeria	Oran	102	4.9	Robino et al. 2008
Egypt		124	7.6	El-Sibai et al. 2009
Egypt		147	12.0	Abu-Amero et al. 2009
Morocco		221	4.1	Fregel et al. 2009
North Africa	Algeria, Tunisia	202	3.5	Fregel et al. 2009

Haplogroup J2 is found with low frequencies in North Africa with a hotspot in Sousse region, most of Sousse samples have the same haplotypes found in Haplogroup J-L271 which was found in Msaken.

=== Central Asia ===
Country/Region	Sampling	N	J-M172	Study
Xinjiang	Lop Uyghurs	64	57.8	Liu Shuhu et al. 2018
Xinjiang	Uyghurs	50	34	Shou et al. 2010
Tajikistan	Yaghnobis	31	32	Wells et al. 2001
Dushanbe	Tajiks	16	31	Wells et al. 2001
Xinjiang	Uzbeks	23	30.4	Shou et al. 2010
Afghanistan	Hazara	60	26.6	Haber et al. 2012
Xinjiang	Keriyan Uyghurs	39	25.6	Liu Shuhu et al. 2018
Kazakhstan	Uyghurs	41	20	Wells et al. 2001
Samarkand	Tajiks	40	20	Wells et al. 2001
Tajikistan	Tajiks	38	18.4	Wells et al. 2001
Turkmenistan	Turkmens	30	17	Wells et al. 2001
Xinjiang	Pamiri Tajiks	31	16.1	Shou et al. 2010
Afghanistan	Uzbeks	126	16	Di Cristofaro et al. 2013
Bukhara	Uzbeks	58	16	Wells et al. 2001
Samarkand	Uzbeks	45	16	Wells et al. 2001
Surkhandarya	Uzbeks	68	16	Wells et al. 2001
Uzbekistan	Uzbeks	366	13.4	Wells et al. 2001
Kazakhstan	Kazakhs	30	13.3	Karafet et al. 2001
Turpan area	Uyghurs	143	9.8	
Hotan area	Uyghurs	478	9.2	
Changji	Hui	175	9.1	
Xinjiang	Dolan Uyghurs	76	7.9	Liu Shuhu et al. 2018
Ningxia	Hui	65	7.7	
Kizilsu	Kyrgyz	241	6.64%	Guo et al. 2020
Kazakhstan	Kazakhs	1294	4.33%	Ashirbekov et al. 2017
Kyrgyzstan	Kyrgyz	132	3.79%	Di Cristofaro et al. 2013

J-M172 is found at moderate frequencies among Central Asian people such as Uyghurs, Uzbeks, Turkmens, Tajiks, Kazakhs, and Yaghnobis. According to the genetic study in Northwest China by Shou et al. (2010), a notable high frequency of J-M172 is observed particularly in Uyghurs 34% and Uzbeks 30.4% in Xinjiang, China. Liu Shuhu et al. (2018) found J2a1 (L26/Page55/PF5110/S57, L27/PF5111/S396) in 43.75% (28/64) and J2a2 (L581/S398) in 14.06% (9/64) of a sample of Lop Uyghurs from Qarchugha Village of Yuli (Lopnur) County, Xinjiang, J2a1b1 (M92, M260/Page14) in 25.64% (10/39) of a sample of Keriyan Uyghurs from Darya Boyi Village of Yutian (Keriya) County, Xinjiang, and J2a1 (L26/Page55/PF5110/S57, L27/PF5111/S396) in 3.95% (3/76) and J2a2 (L581/S398) in 3.95% (3/76) of a sample of Dolan Uyghurs from Horiqol Township of Awat County, Xinjiang. Only far northwestern ethnic minorities had haplogroup J in Xinjiang, China. Uzbeks in the sample had 30.4% J2-M172 and Tajiks of Xinjiang and Uyghurs also had it.

The haplogroup has an ancient presence in Central Asia and seems to have preceded the spread of Islam. In addition, the immediate ancestor of J-M172, namely J* (J-M304*, a.k.a. J-P209*, J-12f2.1*) is also found among Xibo, Kazakh, Dongxiang and Uzbek people in Northwest China.

In 2015, two ancient samples belonging to J-M172 or J-M410 (J2a) were found at two different archaeological sites in Altai, eastern Russia: Kytmanovo and Sary-bel kurgan. Both of the ancient samples are related to Iron Age cultures in Altai. Sary-bel J2/J2a is dated to 50 BC whereas Kytmanovo sample is dated to 721-889 AD. Genetic admixture analysis of these samples also suggests that the individuals were more closely related to West Eurasians than other Altaians from the same period, although they also seem to be related to present-day Turkic peoples of the region.

=== Europe ===
Country/Region	Sampling	N	J-M172	Study
Albania		55	19.9%	Battaglia et al. 2009
Bosnia-Herzegovina	Serbs	81	8.7%	Battaglia et al. 2009
Cyprus		164	12.9%	El-Sibai et al. 2009
Greece	Macedonia	142	14.2%	Heraclides et al. 2017
Greece	Thrace	41	17%	Heraclides et al. 2017
Greece	Asia Minor and Aegean	105	20%	Heraclides et al. 2017
Greece	Thessaly	72	20.8%	Heraclides et al. 2017
Greece	Central Greece and Attica	199	24.1%	Heraclides et al. 2017
Greece	Peloponnese	179	15.6%	Heraclides et al. 2017
Greece	Crete	143	35%	El-Sibai et al. 2009
Iberia		655	7%	Fregel et al. 2009
Iberia		1140	7.7%	Adams et al. 2008
Italy	Sicily	765	22.3%	Heraclides et al. 2017
Italy	North	380	8.6%	Heraclides et al. 2017
Italy	Center	214	19.6%	Heraclides et al. 2017
Italy	South	589	19.7%	Heraclides et al. 2017
Italy	Sardinia	1010	9.6%	Heraclides et al. 2017
Italy	Val Badia	34	8.8%	Capelli et al. 2007
Malta		90	21.1%	El-Sibai et al. 2009
Portugal	North, Center, South	303	6.9%	El-Sibai et al. 2009
Portugal	Tras-os-Montes (Jews)	57	24.55%	Nogueiro et al. 2010
Sardinia		81	9.9%	El-Sibai et al. 2009
Spain	Mallorca	62	8.1%	El-Sibai et al. 2009
Spain	Sevilla	155	7.8%	El-Sibai et al. 2009
Spain	Leon	60	5%	El-Sibai et al. 2009
Spain	Ibiza	54	3.7%	El-Sibai et al. 2009
Spain	Cantabria	70	2.9%	El-Sibai et al. 2009
Spain	Galicia	292	13%	
Spain	Canary Islands	652	10.5%	Fregel et al. 2009

In Europe, the frequency of Haplogroup J-M172 drops as one moves northward away from the Mediterranean. In Italy, J-M172 is found with regional frequencies ranging between 9% and 36%. In Greece, it is found with regional frequencies ranging between 10% and 48%. Detailed and modern phylogenetic analysis strongly suggests the Caucasus and regions North of it as likely to be the origin of the Greek and Italian J-M172 haplogroup.

It has been proposed that haplogroup subclade J-M410 was linked to populations on ancient Crete by examining the relationship between Anatolian, Cretan, and Greek populations from around early Neolithic sites in Crete. Haplogroup J-M172 was associated with Neolithic Greece (ca. 8500 - 4300 BCE) and was reported to be found in modern Crete (3.1%) and mainland Greece (Macedonia 7.0%, Thessaly 8.8%, Argolis 1.8%).

==== North Caucasus ====
Country/Region	Sampling	N	J-M172	Study
Caucasus	Abkhaz	58	13.8	Balanovsky et al. 2011
Caucasus	Avar	115	6	Balanovsky et al. 2011
Caucasus	Chechen	330	57	Balanovsky et al. 2011
Caucasus	Adyghe	142	21.8	Balanovsky et al. 2011
Caucasus	Dargins	101	1	Balanovsky et al. 2011
Caucasus	Ingush	143	88.8	Balanovsky et al. 2011
Caucasus	Kaitak	33	3	Balanovsky et al. 2011
Caucasus	Kumyks	73	21	Yunusbayev et al. 2012
Caucasus	Kubachi	65	0	Balanovsky et al. 2011
Caucasus	Lezghins	81	2.5	Balanovsky et al. 2011
Caucasus	Ossets	357	16	Balanovsky et al. 2011
Caucasus	Shapsug	100	6	Balanovsky et al. 2011
Caucasus		1525	28.1	Balanovsky et al. 2011

J-M172 is found at very high frequencies in certain peoples of the Caucasus: among the Ingush 87.4%, Chechens 57.8%, Georgians 21%-72%, Azeris 24%-48%, Abkhaz 25%, Balkars 24%, Ossetians 24%, Armenians 21%-24%, Adyghe 21.8%, and other groups.

=== West Asia ===
Country/Region	Sampling	N	J-M172	Study
Jewish	Ashkenazim Jewish	442	19	Behar et al. 2004
Iran		92	25	El-Sibai et al. 2009
Iraq		154	24	Al-Zahery et al. 2011 (Note: Only 37 of 154 samples (24%) are J2 in Iraq. 43.6% is the frequency of J2 among all J haplogroup Iraqis, not all haplogroups.)
Bahrain	Northern, Capital, Muharraq, South	562	27.6	
Palestinian Arab	Akka	101	18.6	El-Sibai et al. 2009
Jordan		273	14.6	El-Sibai et al. 2009
Lebanon		951	29.4	El-Sibai et al. 2009
Oman		121	10.0	Abu-Amero et al. 2009
Qatar		72	8.3	El-Sibai et al. 2009
Saudi Arabia		157	14	Abu-Amero et al. 2009 (Note: "The most abundant haplogroups in Saudi Arabia, J1-M267 (42%), J2-M172 (14%), E1-M2 (8%), R1-M17 (5%) and K2-M184 (5%) are also well represented in other Arabian populations (Table 1).")
Syria	Syria	554	20.8	El-Sibai et al. 2009
Turkey		523	24.2	El-Sibai et al. 2009
UAE		164	10.3	El-Sibai et al. 2009
Yemen		62	9.6	El-Sibai et al. 2009

Sephardi Jews have about 15%-29%, of haplogroup J-M172, and Ashkenazi Jews have 15%-23%. It was reported in an early study which tested only four STR markers that a small sample of Italian Cohens belonged to Network 1.2, an early designation for the overall clade now known as J-L26, defined by the deletion at DYS413. However, a large number of all Jewish Cohens in the world belong to haplogroup J-M267 (see Cohen modal haplotype). Approximately 24% of Turkish men are J-M172, with regional frequencies ranging between 13% and 40%. Combined with J-M267, up to half of the Turkish population belongs to Haplogroup J-P209.

Haplogroup J-M172 has been shown to have a more northern distribution in the Middle East, although it exists in significant amounts in the southern middle-east regions, a lesser amount of it was found when compared to its brother haplogroup, J-M267, which has a high frequency southerly distribution. It was believed that the source population of J-M172 originated from the Levant/Syria (Syrid-J-M172), and that its occurrence among modern populations of Europe, Central Asia, and South Asia was a sign of the Neolithic agriculturalists. However, as stated it is now believed more likely to have been spread in waves, as a result of post-Neolithic processes .

=== South Asia ===
Haplogroup J2 has been present in South Asia mostly as J2a-M410 and J2b-M102, since Neolithic times (9500 YBP). J2-M172 was found to be significantly higher among Dravidian castes at 19% than among Indo-Aryan castes at 11%. J2-M172 and J-M410 is found 21% among Dravidian middle castes, followed by upper castes, 18.6%, and lower castes 14%. Among caste groups, the highest frequency of J2-M172 was observed among Tamil Vellalars of South India, at 38.7%. J2 is present in Indian tribals too and has a frequency of 11% in Austro-Asiatic tribals. Among the Austro-Asiatic tribals, the predominant J2 occurs in the Asur tribe (77.5%) albeit with a sample size of 40 and in the Lodha (35%) of West Bengal. J2 is also present in the South Indian hill tribe Toda at 38.46% albeit with a sample size of only 26, in the Andh tribe of Telangana at 35.19%, in the Narikuravar tribe at 57.9% and in the Kol tribe of Uttar Pradesh at a frequency of 33.34%. Haplogroup J-P209 was found to be more common in India's Shia Muslims, of which 28.7% belong to haplogroup J, with 13.7% in J-M410, 10.6% in J-M267 and 4.4% in J2b.

In Pakistan, the highest frequencies of J2-M172 were observed among the Parsis at 38.89%, the Dravidian speaking Brahui's at 28.18% and the Makrani Balochs at 24%. It also occurs at 18.18% in Makrani Siddis and at 3% in Karnataka Siddis.

J2-M172 is found at an overall frequency of 16.1% in the people of Sri Lanka. In Maldives, 22% of Maldivian population were found to be haplogroup J2 positive. Subclades of M172 such as M67 and M92 were not found in either Indian or Pakistani samples which also might hint at a partial common origin.

J2-M172 has been observed in 15.9% (20/164 J2a-M410, 6/164 J2b2-M241) of Tharu from Uttar Pradesh, 13.4% (19/202 J2a-M410, 8/202 J2b2-M241) of Tharu from Nepal, and 8.9% (4/45 J2a-M410) of Tharu from Uttarakhand.

== Subclade distribution ==
Haplogroup J-M172 is subdivided into two complementary sub-haplogroups: J-M410, defined by the M410 genetic marker, and J-M12, defined by the M12 genetic marker.

=== J-M172 ===
J-M172 is typical of populations of the Near East, Southern Europe, Southwest Asia and the Caucasus, with a moderate distribution through much of Central Asia, South Asia, and North Africa.

=== J-M410 ===
J-M410* is found in Georgia, North Ossetia.

=== J-M47 ===
J-M47 is found with low frequency in Georgia, southern Iran, Qatar, Saudi Arabia, Syria, Tunisia, Turkey, United Arab Emirates, and Central Asia/Siberia.

=== J-M67 ===
J-M67 (called J2f in older papers) has its highest frequencies associated with Nakh peoples. Found at very high (majority) frequencies among Ingush in Malgobek (87.4%), Chechens in Dagestan (58%), Chechens in Chechnya (56.8%) and Chechens in Malgobek, Ingushetia (50.9%). In the Caucasus, it is found at significant frequencies among Georgians (13.3%), Iron Ossetes (11.3%), South Caucasian Balkars (6.3%), Digor Ossetes (5.5%), Abkhaz (6.9%), and Cherkess (5.6%). It is also found at notable frequencies in the Mediterranean, including Cretans (10.2%), North-central Italians (9.6%), Southern Italians (4.2%; only 0.8% among N. Italians), Anatolian Turks (2.7-5.4%), Greeks (4-4.3%), Albanians (3.6%), Ashkenazi Jews (4.9%), Sephardis (2.4%), Catalans (3.9%), Andalusians (3.2%), Calabrians (3.3%), Albanian Calabrians (8.9%).

J-M92/M260, a subclade of J-M67, has been observed in 25.64% (10/39) of a sample of Keriyan Uyghurs from Darya Boyi Village of Yutian (Keriya) County, Xinjiang. This Uyghur village is located in a remote oasis in the Taklamakan Desert.

=== J-M319 ===
Two individuals from Lasithi Plateau, Greece, who lived c. 2400-1700 BC, belonged to haplogroup J-M319. J-M319 is found with low to moderate frequency in Cretan Greeks, Iraqi Jews, and Moroccan Jews.

=== J-M158 ===
J-M158 (location under L24 uncertain) J-M158 is found with low frequency in Turkey, South Asia, Indochina, and Iberian Peninsula.

== Phylogenetics ==
In Y-chromosome phylogenetics, subclades are the branches of haplogroups. These subclades are also defined by single nucleotide polymorphisms (SNPs) or unique event polymorphisms (UEPs).

=== Phylogenetic history ===
Prior to 2002, there were in academic literature at least seven naming systems for the Y-Chromosome Phylogenetic tree. This led to considerable confusion. In 2002, the major research groups came together and formed the Y-Chromosome Consortium (YCC). They published a joint paper that created a single new tree that all agreed to use. Later, a group of citizen scientists with an interest in population genetics and genetic genealogy formed a working group to create an amateur tree aiming at being above all timely. The table below brings together all of these works at the point of the landmark 2002 YCC Tree. This allows a researcher reviewing older published literature to quickly move between nomenclatures.

YCC 2002/2008 (Shorthand)	(α)	(β)	(γ)	(δ)	(ε)	(ζ)	(η)	YCC 2002 (Longhand)	YCC 2005 (Longhand)	YCC 2008 (Longhand)	YCC 2010r (Longhand)	ISOGG 2006	ISOGG 2007	ISOGG 2008	ISOGG 2009	ISOGG 2010	ISOGG 2011	ISOGG 2012
J-12f2a	9	VI	Med	23	Eu10	H4	B	J*	J	J	J	-	-	-	-	-	-	J
J-M62	9	VI	Med	23	Eu10	H4	B	J1	J1a	J1a	J1a	-	-	-	-	-	-	Private
J-M172	9	VI	Med	24	Eu9	H4	B	J2*	J2	J2	J2	-	-	-	-	-	-	J2
J-M47	9	VI	Med	24	Eu9	H4	B	J2a	J2a	J2a1	J2a4a	-	-	-	-	-	-	J2a1a
J-M68	9	VI	Med	24	Eu9	H4	B	J2b	J2b	J2a3	J2a4c	-	-	-	-	-	-	J2a1c
J-M137	9	VI	Med	24	Eu9	H4	B	J2c	J2c	J2a4	J2a4h2a1	-	-	-	-	-	-	J2a1h2a1a
J-M158	9	VI	Med	24	Eu9	H4	B	J2d	J2d	J2a5	J2a4h1	-	-	-	-	-	-	J2a1h1
J-M12	9	VI	Med	24	Eu9	H4	B	J2e*	J2e	J2b	J2b	-	-	-	-	-	-	J2b
J-M102	9	VI	Med	24	Eu9	H4	B	J2e1*	J2e1	J2b	J2b	-	-	-	-	-	-	J2b
J-M99	9	VI	Med	24	Eu9	H4	B	J2e1a	J2e1a	J2b2a	J2b2a	-	-	-	-	-	-	Private
J-M67	9	VI	Med	24	Eu9	H4	B	J2f*	J2f	J2a2	J2a4b	-	-	-	-	-	-	J2a1b
J-M92	9	VI	Med	24	Eu9	H4	B	J2f1	J2f1	J2a2a	J2a4b1	-	-	-	-	-	-	J2a1b1
J-M163	9	VI	Med	24	Eu9	H4	B	J2f2	J2f2	J2a2b	J2a4b2	-	-	-	-	-	-	Private

==== Research publications ====
The following research teams per their publications were represented in the creation of the YCC Tree.

- α Jobling & Tyler-Smith 2000 and Kaladjieva et al. 2001
- β Underhill et al. 2000
- γ Hammer et al. 2001
- δ Karafet et al. 2001
- ε Semino et al. 2000
- ζ Su et al. 1999
- η Capelli et al. 2001

=== Phylogenetic trees ===
There are several confirmed and proposed phylogenetic trees available for haplogroup J-M172. The scientifically accepted one is the Y-Chromosome Consortium (YCC) one published in Karafet et al. (2008) and subsequently updated. A draft tree that shows emerging science is provided by Thomas Krahn at the Genomic Research Center in Houston, Texas. The International Society of Genetic Genealogy (ISOGG) also provides an amateur tree.

==== The Genomic Research Center draft tree ====
This is Thomas Krahn at the Genomic Research Center's draft tree Proposed Tree for haplogroup J-M172. For brevity, only the first three levels of subclades are shown.

- M172, L228
  - M410, L152, L212, L505, L532, L559
    - PF5008
      - Y182822
        - L581
          - Z37823
    - PF4610
      - Z6046
      - L26
  - M12, M102, M221, M314, L282
    - M205
    - M241
      - M99
      - M280
      - M321
      - P84
      - L283

==== The Y-Chromosome Consortium tree ====
This is the official scientific tree produced by the Y-Chromosome Consortium (YCC). The last major update was in 2008. Subsequent updates have been quarterly and biannual. The current version is a revision of the 2010 update.

==== The ISOGG tree ====
Below are the subclades of Haplogroup J-M172 with their defining mutation, according to the ISOGG tree as of January 2020. Note that the descent-based identifiers may be subject to change, as new SNPs are discovered that augment and further refine the tree. For brevity, only the first three levels of subclades are shown.

- J2 M172/Page28/PF4908, L228/PF4895/S321
  - J2a M410, L152, L212/PF4988, L559/PF4986
    - J2a1 DYS413≤18, L26/Page55/PF5110/S57, F4326/L27/PF5111/S396
      - J2a1a M47, M322
      - J2a1b M67/PF5137/S51
      - J2a1c M68
      - J2a1d M319
      - J2a1e M339
      - J2a1f M419
      - J2a1g P81/PF4275
      - J2a1h L24/S286, L207.1
      - J2a1i L88.2, L198
    - J2a2 L581/PF5026/S398
      - J2a2a P279/PF5065
  - J2b M12
    - J2b1 M205
      - J2b1a~ A11525, PH4306, Y22059, Y22060, Y22061, Y22062, Y22063
      - J2b1b~ CTS1969
    - J2b2~ CTS2622/Z1827, CTS11335/Z2440, Z575
      - J2b2a M241

== See also ==
=== Genetics ===
- Conversion table for Y chromosome haplogroups
- Genetic Genealogy
- Genetic history of the Middle East
- Genetic history of Europe
- Haplogroup
- Haplotype
- Human Y-chromosome DNA haplogroup
- Molecular Phylogeny
- Paragroup
- Subclade
- Y-chromosomal Aaron
- Y-chromosome haplogroups in populations of the world
- Y-DNA haplogroups in populations of Europe
- Y-DNA haplogroups in populations of South Asia
- Y-DNA haplogroups in populations of East and Southeast Asia
- Y-DNA haplogroups in populations of the Near East
- Y-DNA haplogroups in populations of North Africa
- Y-DNA haplogroups in populations of the Caucasus
- Y-DNA haplogroups by ethnic group

=== Other Y-DNA J Subclades ===
- J-L24
- J-L192
- J-L271
- J-L283
- J-M241
- J-M267
- J-P58
- J-P209

== Bibliography ==
- Abu-Amero KK, Hellani A, González AM, Larruga JM, Cabrera VM, Underhill PA (2009). "Saudi Arabian Y-Chromosome diversity and its relationship with nearby regions". BMC Genetics. 10 59. doi:10.1186/1471-2156-10-59. PMC 2759955. PMID 19772609.
- Adams, SM; Bosch, E; Balaresque, PL; Ballereau, SJ; Lee, AC; Arroyo, E; López-Parra, AM; Aler, M; et al. (2008). "The genetic legacy of religious diversity and intolerance: paternal lineages of Christians, Jews, and Muslims in the Iberian Peninsula". American Journal of Human Genetics. 83 (6): 725–36. doi:10.1016/j.ajhg.2008.11.007. PMC 2668061. PMID 19061982.
- Al-Zahery N, Semino O, Benuzzi G, Magri C, Passarino G, Torroni A, Santachiara-Benerecetti AS (September 2003). "Y-chromosome and mtDNA polymorphisms in Iraq, a crossroad of the early human dispersal and of post-Neolithic migrations" (PDF). Molecular Phylogenetics and Evolution. 28 (3): 458–472. Bibcode:2003MolPE..28..458A. doi:10.1016/S1055-7903(03)00039-3. PMID 12927131. Archived from the original (PDF) on 27 December 2010 – via Family Tree DNA.
- Al-Zahery N, Pala M, Battaglia V, Grugni V, Hamod MA, Hooshiar Kashani B, et al. (2011). "In search of the genetic footprints of Sumerians: A survey of Y-chromosome and mtDNA variation in the Marsh Arabs of Iraq". BMC Evolutionary Biology. 11 (1) 288. Bibcode:2011BMCEE..11..288A. doi:10.1186/1471-2148-11-288. PMC 3215667. PMID 21970613.
  - Al-Zahery; et al. (2011t). "Additional file 3. Absolute frequencies of Y-chromosome haplogroups and sub-haplogroups in the 48 populations included in the PCA". BMC Evolutionary Biology. 11 (1): 288. Bibcode:2011BMCEE..11..288A. doi:10.1186/1471-2148-11-288. PMC 3215667. PMID 21970613.
- Arredi B, Poloni ES, Paracchini S, Zerjal T, Fathallah DM, Makrelouf M, Pascali VL, Novelletto A, Tyler-Smith C (2004). "A Predominantly Neolithic Origin for Y-Chromosomal DNA Variation in North Africa". The American Journal of Human Genetics. 75 (2): 338–45. doi:10.1086/423147. PMC 1216069. PMID 15202071.
- Ashirbekov, E. E.; et al. (2017). "Distribution of Y-Chromosome Haplogroups of the Kazakh from the South Kazakhstan, Zhambyl, and Almaty Regions" (PDF). Reports of the National Academy of Sciences of the Republic of Kazakhstan. 6 (316): 85–95. Archived from the original (PDF) on 2021-09-23.
- Balanovsky O, Dibirova K, Dybo A, Mudrak O, Frolova S, Pocheshkhova E, et al. (2011). "Parallel Evolution of Genes and Languages in the Caucasus Region". Molecular Biology and Evolution. 28 (10): 2905–20. doi:10.1093/molbev/msr126. PMC 3355373. PMID 21571925.
- Battaglia V, Fornarino S, Al-Zahery N, Olivieri A, Pala M, Myres NM, et al. (2009). "Y-chromosomal evidence of the cultural diffusion of agriculture in southeast Europe". European Journal of Human Genetics. 17 (6): 820–830. doi:10.1038/ejhg.2008.249. PMC 2947100. PMID 19107149.
- Behar, Doron M.; Garrigan, Daniel; Kaplan, Matthew E.; Mobasher, Zahra; Rosengarten, Dror; Karafet, Tatiana M.; et al. (1 March 2004). "Contrasting patterns of Y chromosome variation in Ashkenazi Jewish and host non-Jewish European populations". Human Genetics. 114 (4): 354–365. doi:10.1007/s00439-003-1073-7. PMID 14740294. S2CID 10310338.
- Cadenas AM, Zhivotovsky LA, Cavalli-Sforza LL, Underhill PA, Herrera RJ (2007). "Y-chromosome diversity characterizes the Gulf of Oman". European Journal of Human Genetics. 16 (3): 374–86. doi:10.1038/sj.ejhg.5201934. PMID 17928816.
- Capelli C, Redhead N, Romano V, Calì F, Lefranc G, Delague V, et al. (2006). "Population Structure in the Mediterranean Basin: A Y Chromosome Perspective". Annals of Human Genetics. 70 (2): 207–225. doi:10.1111/j.1529-8817.2005.00224.x. hdl:2108/37090. PMID 16626331. S2CID 25536759.
- Capelli C, Brisighelli F, Scarnicci F, Arredi B, Caglia' A, Vetrugno G, et al. (2007). "Y chromosome genetic variation in the Italian peninsula is clinal and supports an admixture model for the Mesolithic–Neolithic encounter". Molecular Phylogenetics and Evolution. 44 (1): 228–39. Bibcode:2007MolPE..44..228C. doi:10.1016/j.ympev.2006.11.030. PMID 17275346.
- Cinnioğlu C, King R, Kivisild T, Kalfoğlu E, Atasoy S, Cavalleri GL, et al. (2004). "Excavating Y-chromosome haplotype strata in Anatolia". Human Genetics. 114 (2): 127–48. doi:10.1007/s00439-003-1031-4. PMID 14586639. S2CID 10763736.
- Di Cristofaro J, Pennarun E, Mazières S, Myres NM, Lin AA, Temori SA, et al. (2013). "Afghan Hindu Kush: where Eurasian sub-continent gene flows converge". PLOS ONE. 8 (10). e76748. Bibcode:2013PLoSO...876748D. doi:10.1371/journal.pone.0076748. PMC 3799995. PMID 24204668.
- Di Giacomo F, Luca F, Anagnou N, Ciavarella G, Corbo RM, Cresta M, et al. (2003). "Clinal patterns of human Y chromosomal diversity in continental Italy and Greece are dominated by drift and founder effects". Molecular Phylogenetics and Evolution. 28 (3): 387–395. Bibcode:2003MolPE..28..387D. doi:10.1016/S1055-7903(03)00016-2. PMID 12927125.
- Di Giacomo F, Luca F, Popa LO, Akar N, Anagnou N, Banyko J, et al. (2004). "Y chromosomal haplogroup J as a signature of the post-neolithic colonization of Europe". Human Genetics. 115 (5): 357–371. doi:10.1007/s00439-004-1168-9. PMID 15322918. S2CID 18482536.
- Eaaswarkhanth M, Haque I, Ravesh Z, Romero IG, Meganathan PR, Dubey B, et al. (2009). "Traces of sub-Saharan and Middle Eastern lineages in Indian Muslim populations". European Journal of Human Genetics. 18 (3): 354–63. doi:10.1038/ejhg.2009.168. PMC 2859343. PMID 19809480.
- El-Sibai M, Platt DE, Haber M, Xue Y, Youhanna SC, Wells RS, et al. (2009). "Geographical Structure of the Y-chromosomal Genetic Landscape of the Levant: A coastal-inland contrast". Annals of Human Genetics. 73 (6): 568–81. doi:10.1111/j.1469-1809.2009.00538.x. PMC 3312577. PMID 19686289. This paper reported results from several studies : Di Giacomo 2003, Al-Zahery 2003, Flores 2004, Cinnioglu 2004, Capelli 2006, Goncalves 2005, Zalloua 2008, Cadenas 2008
- Fadhlaoui-Zid, Karima (2014). "Sousse: extreme genetic heterogeneity in North Africa". Journal of Human Genetics. 60 (1): 41–49. doi:10.1038/jhg.2014.99. PMID 25471516. S2CID 25186140.
- Fregel, Rosa; Gomes, Verónica; Gusmão, Leonor; González, Ana M; Cabrera, Vicente M; Amorim, António; Larruga, Jose M (2009). "Demographic history of Canary Islands male gene-pool: replacement of native lineages by European". BMC Evolutionary Biology. 9 (1): 181. Bibcode:2009BMCEE...9..181F. doi:10.1186/1471-2148-9-181. PMC 2728732. PMID 19650893.
- Finocchio, Andrea; Trombetta, Beniamino; Messina, Francesco; D'Atanasio, Eugenia; Akar, Nejat; Loutradis, Aphrodite; Michalodimitrakis, Emmanuel I.; Cruciani, Fulvio; Novelletto, Andrea (10 May 2018). "A finely resolved phylogeny of Y chromosome Hg J illuminates the processes of Phoenician and Greek colonizations in the Mediterranean". Scientific Reports. 8 (1): 7465. Bibcode:2018NatSR...8.7465F. doi:10.1038/s41598-018-25912-9. ISSN 2045-2322. PMC 5945646. PMID 29748665.
- Firasat, Sadaf; Khaliq, Shagufta; Mohyuddin, Aisha; Papaioannou, Myrto; Tyler-Smith, Chris; Underhill, Peter A.; Ayub, Qasim (2007). "Y-chromosomal evidence for a limited Greek contribution to the Pathan population of Pakistan". European Journal of Human Genetics. 15 (1): 121–126. doi:10.1038/sj.ejhg.5201726. PMC 2588664. PMID 17047675.
- Grugni V, Battaglia V, Hooshiar Kashani B, Parolo S, Al-Zahery N, Achilli A, et al. (2012). Kivisild T (ed.). "Ancient Migratory Events in the Middle East: New Clues from the Y-Chromosome Variation of Modern Iranians". PLOS ONE. 7 (7) e41252. Bibcode:2012PLoSO...741252G. doi:10.1371/journal.pone.0041252. PMC 3399854. PMID 22815981.
- Guo, Yuxin; Xia, Zhiyu; Cui, Wei; Chen, Chong; Jin, Xiaoye; Zhu, Bofeng (2020-05-18). "Joint Genetic Analyses of Mitochondrial and Y-Chromosome Molecular Markers for a Population from Northwest China". Genes. 11 (5): 564. doi:10.3390/genes11050564. PMC 7290686. PMID 32443545.
- Haber M, Platt DE, Ashrafian Bonab M, Youhanna SC, Soria-Hernanz DF, Martínez-Cruz B, et al. (2012). Kayser M (ed.). "Afghanistan's Ethnic Groups Share a Y-Chromosomal Heritage Structured by Historical Events". PLOS ONE. 7 (3) e34288. Bibcode:2012PLoSO...734288H. doi:10.1371/journal.pone.0034288. PMC 3314501. PMID 22470552.
- Karafet TM, Mendez FL, Meilerman MB, Underhill PA, Zegura SL, Hammer MF (2008). "New binary polymorphisms reshape and increase resolution of the human Y chromosomal haplogroup tree". Genome Research. 18 (5): 830–838. doi:10.1101/gr.7172008. PMC 2336805. PMID 18385274.
- Heraclides, Alexandros; Bashiardes, Evy; Fernández-Domínguez, Eva; Bertoncini, Stefania; Chimonas, Marios; Christofi, Vasilis; King, Jonathan; Budowle, Bruce; Manoli, Panayiotis; Cariolou, Marios A. (2017). "Y-chromosomal analysis of Greek Cypriots reveals a primarily common pre-Ottoman paternal ancestry with Turkish Cypriots". PLOS ONE. 12 (6) e0179474. Bibcode:2017PLoSO..1279474H. doi:10.1371/journal.pone.0179474. ISSN 1932-6203. PMC 5473566. PMID 28622394.
- King RJ, Ozcan SS, Carter T, Kalfoğlu E, Atasoy S, Triantaphyllidis C, et al. (2008). "Differential Y-chromosome Anatolian Influences on the Greek and Cretan Neolithic". Annals of Human Genetics. 72 (2): 205–14. doi:10.1111/j.1469-1809.2007.00414.x. PMID 18269686. S2CID 22406638.
- Liu Shuhu; Nizam Yilihamu; Rabiyamu Bake; Abdukeram Bupatima; Dolkun Matyusup (2018). "Yìngyòng Y rǎnsètǐ SNP duì Xīnjiāng sān gè gélí rénqún yíchuán duōyàng xìng de yánjiū" 应用 Y 染色体 SNP 对新疆三个隔离人群遗传多样性的研究 [A study of genetic diversity of three isolated populations in Xinjiang using Y-SNP]. Rénlèixué xuébào [Acta Anthropologica Sinica] (in Chinese). 37 (1): 146–156. doi:10.16359/j.cnki.cn11-1963/q.2017.0067.
- Luis JR, Rowold DJ, Regueiro M, Caeiro B, Cinnioğlu C, Roseman C, et al. (2004). "The Levant versus the Horn of Africa: Evidence for Bidirectional Corridors of Human Migrations". The American Journal of Human Genetics. 74 (3): 532–44. doi:10.1086/382286. PMC 1182266. PMID 14973781.
- Martinez L, Underhill PA, Zhivotovsky LA, Gayden T, Moschonas NK, Chow CE, et al. (2007). "Paleolithic Y-haplogroup heritage predominates in a Cretan highland plateau". European Journal of Human Genetics. 15 (4): 485–93. doi:10.1038/sj.ejhg.5201769. PMID 17264870.
- Nasidze I, Sarkisian T, Kerimov A, Stoneking M (2003). "Testing hypotheses of language replacement in the Caucasus: evidence from the Y-chromosome". Human Genetics. 112 (3): 255–61. doi:10.1007/s00439-002-0874-4. PMID 12596050. S2CID 13232436.
- Nasidze I, Ling EY, Quinque D, Dupanloup I, Cordaux R, Rychkov S, et al. (2004). "Mitochondrial DNA and Y-Chromosome Variation in the Caucasus". Annals of Human Genetics. 68 (3): 205–21. doi:10.1046/j.1529-8817.2004.00092.x. PMID 15180701. S2CID 27204150.
- Nebel A, Filon D, Brinkmann B, Majumder PP, Faerman M, Oppenheim A (2001). "The Y Chromosome Pool of Jews as Part of the Genetic Landscape of the Middle East". American Journal of Human Genetics. 69 (5): 1095–1112. doi:10.1086/324070. PMC 1274378. PMID 11573163.
- Nogueiro, I.; Manco, L.; Gomes, V.; Amorim, A.; Gusmão, L. (2010). "Phylogeographic analysis of paternal lineages in NE Portuguese Jewish communities". American Journal of Physical Anthropology. 141 (3): 373–381. Bibcode:2010AJPA..141..373N. doi:10.1002/ajpa.21154. PMID 19918998.
- Regueiro M, Cadenas AM, Gayden T, Underhill PA, Herrera RJ (2006). "Iran: Tricontinental Nexus for Y-Chromosome Driven Migration". Human Heredity. 61 (3): 132–143. doi:10.1159/000093774. PMID 16770078. S2CID 7017701.
- Robino C, Crobu F, Di Gaetano C, Bekada A, Benhamamouch S, Cerutti N, et al. (2008). "Analysis of Y-chromosomal SNP haplogroups and STR haplotypes in an Algerian population sample". International Journal of Legal Medicine. 122 (3): 251–255. doi:10.1007/s00414-007-0203-5. PMID 17909833. S2CID 11556974.
- Sanchez JJ, Hallenberg C, Børsting C, Hernandez A, Morling N (2005). "High frequencies of Y chromosome lineages characterized by E3b1, DYS19-11, DYS392-12 in Somali males". European Journal of Human Genetics. 13 (7): 856–66. doi:10.1038/sj.ejhg.5201390. PMID 15756297.
- Semino O, Magri C, Benuzzi G, Lin AA, Al-Zahery N, Battaglia V, et al. (2004). "Origin, Diffusion, and Differentiation of Y-Chromosome Haplogroups E and J: Inferences on the Neolithization of Europe and Later Migratory Events in the Mediterranean Area". The American Journal of Human Genetics. 74 (5): 1023–34. Bibcode:2004AmJHG..74.1023S. doi:10.1086/386295. PMC 1181965. PMID 15069642.
- Sengupta S, Zhivotovsky LA, King R, Mehdi SQ, Edmonds CA, Chow CE, et al. (2006). "Polarity and Temporality of High-Resolution Y-Chromosome Distributions in India Identify Both Indigenous and Exogenous Expansions and Reveal Minor Genetic Influence of Central Asian Pastoralists". The American Journal of Human Genetics. 78 (2): 202–21. Bibcode:2006AmJHG..78..202S. doi:10.1086/499411. PMC 1380230. PMID 16400607.
- Shen P, Lavi T, Kivisild T, Chou V, Sengun D, Gefel D, et al. (2004). "Reconstruction of patrilineages and matrilineages of Samaritans and other Israeli populations from Y-Chromosome and mitochondrial DNA sequence Variation". Human Mutation. 24 (3): 248–60. doi:10.1002/humu.20077. PMID 15300852. S2CID 1571356.
- Shou WH, Qiao EF, Wei CY, Dong YL, Tan SJ, Shi H, et al. (2010). "Y-chromosome distributions among populations in Northwest China identify significant contribution from Central Asian pastoralists and lesser influence of western Eurasians". Journal of Human Genetics. 55 (5): 314–322. doi:10.1038/jhg.2010.30. PMID 20414255. S2CID 23002493.
- Soodyall H (2013). "Lemba origins revisited: Tracing the ancestry of Y chromosomes in South African and Zimbabwean Lemba". South African Medical Journal. 103 (12): 1009–1013. doi:10.7196/SAMJ.7297 (inactive 18 September 2026). PMID 24300649.
- Vadimovna, Trofimova Natalia (2015). Variability of mitochondrial dna and y-chromosome in populations of the volga-ural region. 03.02.07 (dissertation) (in Russian). Federal State Budgetary Institution of Science; Institute of Biochemistry and Genetics; UFA Scientific Center of the Russian Academy Of Sciences.
  - Вадимовна, Трофимова Наталья (2015). Изменчивость митохондриальной днк и y-хромосомы В популяциях волго-уральского региона. 03.02.07 (PDF) (dissertation) (in Russian). Федеральное Государственное Бюджетное Учреждение Науки; Институт Биохимии и Генетики; УФИ Мского Научного Центра Российской Академии Наук. Archived from the original (PDF) on 2015-01-14.
- Wells RS, Yuldasheva N, Ruzibakiev R, Underhill PA, Evseeva I, Blue-Smith J, et al. (2001). "The Eurasian Heartland: A continental perspective on Y-chromosome diversity". Proceedings of the National Academy of Sciences. 98 (18): 10244–9. Bibcode:2001PNAS...9810244W. doi:10.1073/pnas.171305098. PMC 56946. PMID 11526236.
- Yunusbayev B, Metspalu M, Järve M, Kutuev I, Rootsi S, Metspalu E, et al. (2012). "The Caucasus as an asymmetric semipermeable barrier to ancient human migrations". Molecular Biology and Evolution. 29 (1): 359–65. doi:10.1093/molbev/msr221. PMID 21917723.
- Zalloua P, Wells S (October 2004). "Who Were the Phoenicians?". National Geographic Magazine.
- Zalloua PA, Xue Y, Khalife J, Makhoul N, Debiane L, Platt DE, et al. (2008). "Y-Chromosomal Diversity in Lebanon is Structured by Recent Historical Events". The American Journal of Human Genetics. 82 (4): 873–82. doi:10.1016/j.ajhg.2008.01.020. PMC 2427286. PMID 18374297.

YCC 2002/2008 (Shorthand)	J-M172
Jobling & Tyler-Smith 2000	9
Underhill 2000	VI
Hammer 2001	Med
Karafet 2001	24
Semino 2000	Eu9
Su 1999	H4
Capelli 2001	B
YCC 2002 (Longhand)	J2*
YCC 2005 (Longhand)	J2
YCC 2008 (Longhand)	J2
YCC 2010r (Longhand)	J2

YCC 2002/2008 (Shorthand)	J-P209 (AKA J-12f2.1 or J-M304)
Jobling & Tyler-Smith 2000	9
Underhill 2000	VI
Hammer 2001	Med
Karafet 2001	23
Semino 2000	Eu10
Su 1999	H4
Capelli 2001	B
YCC 2002 (Longhand)	J*
YCC 2005 (Longhand)	J
YCC 2008 (Longhand)	J
YCC 2010r (Longhand)	J
