= Haplogroup H (Y-DNA) =

Human Y-chromosome DNA haplogroup

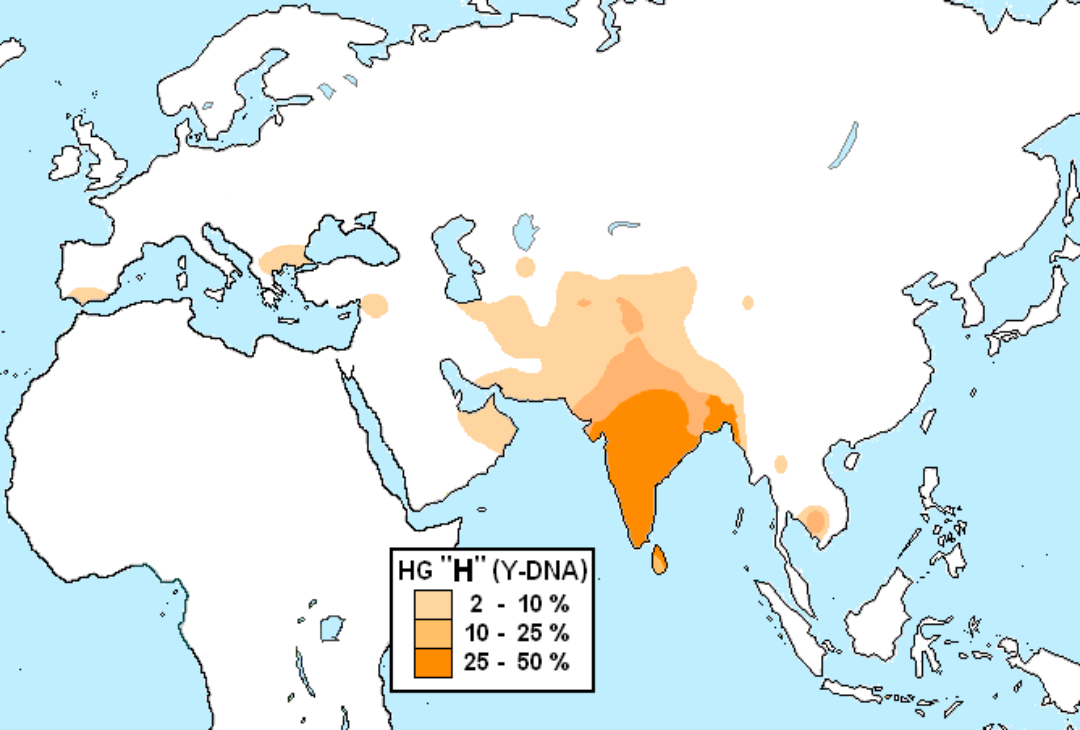
- Haplogroup H map
- Possible time of origin: ~48,500 ybp
- Possible place of origin: South Central Asia for H1a (M69), South Asia or Southern Central Asia
- Ancestor: HIJK
- Descendants: H1 (L902/M3061); H2 (P96); H3 (Z5857)
- Defining mutations: L901/M2939
- Highest frequencies: South Asians and Roma

Haplogroup H (Y-DNA), also known as H-L901/M2939, is a Y-chromosome haplogroup.

The primary branch H1 (H-M69) and its subclades is one of the most predominant haplogroups amongst populations in South Asia, particularly its descendant H1a1 (M52). H1a (M69) originated about 30,000 years ago in South Central Asia or western India. A primary branch of H-M52, H1a1a (H-M82), is found commonly among the Roma, who originated in South Asia and migrated into the Middle East and Europe, around the beginning of the 2nd millennium CE The much rarer primary branch H3 (Z5857) is also concentrated in South Asia.

However, the primary branch H2 (P96) seems to have been found in sparse levels primarily in Europe and West Asia since prehistory. It has been found in remains of the Pre-Pottery Neolithic B (PPNB), which is part of the Pre-Pottery Neolithic, a Neolithic culture centered in upper Mesopotamia and the Levant, dating to c. 10,800 – c. 8,500 years ago, and also the later Linear Pottery culture and Neolithic Iberia. H2 likely entered Europe during the Neolithic with the spread of agriculture. Its present distribution is made up of various individual cases spread out throughout Europe and West Asia today.

== Structure ==
H-L901/M2939 is a direct descendant of Haplogroup GHIJK. There are, in turn, three direct descendants of H-L901/M2939 – their defining SNPs are as follows:

- H1 (L902/M3061)
  - H1a previously haplogroup H1 (M69/Page45, M370)
  - H1b B108, Z34961, Z34962, Z34963, Z34964
- H2 previously haplogroup F3, (P96, L279, L281, L284, L285, L286, M282)
  - H2a FGC29299/Z19067
  - H2b Z41290
  - H2c Y21618, Z19080
- H3 (Z5857)
  - H3a (Z5866)
  - H3b (Z13871)

== Ancient distribution ==
H-L901/M2939 is believed to have split from HIJK 48,500 years before present. Ancient samples of H1a have been found in Iran, Turkmenistan, Afghanistan etc., and ancient H2 samples have been found in Levant, Anatolia and Europe. It may have been present in pre-Neolithic inhabitants of South Asia. Possible site of introduction may be West Asia or (for H1) northwest part of South Asia, since it is highly concentrated there.

=== H1a ===
Shahr-i Sokhta and Gonur sites

Shahr-e Sukhteh, Iran and Gonur, Turkmenistan. H1a1d2 - Bronze Age, 3200-1900 BCE.

H1a ANCIENT SAMPLES
Sample ID	Location	Radiocarbon Age	Y-DNA
I11459	Shahr-i Sokhta, Iran	2875-2631 calBCE	H1a1d2
I10409	Gonur, Turkmenistan	2280-2044 calBCE	H1a1d2

Gogdara and Barikot sites

With limited ancient DNA testing in South Asia, accordingly there is a limited amount of ancient samples for H1a, despite it being a populous and well distributed haplogroup today. The first set of ancient DNA from South Asia was published in 2019. 65 samples were collected from the Swat Valley of northern Pakistan, 2 of which belonged to H1a.

H1a ANCIENT SAMPLES
Date	Subclade	Location	Country	Culture	Accompanying haplogroups	Source
1100-900 BC	H1a1	Gogdara, Swat Valley	Pakistan	Udegram Iron Age	E1b1b1b2, E1b1b1b2a	
1000-800 BC	H1a1	Barikot, Swat Valley	Pakistan	Barikot Iron Age		

=== H2 ===
The earliest sample of H2 is found in the Pre-Pottery Neolithic B culture of the Levant 10,300 years ago. From ancient samples, it is clear that H2 also has a strong association with the spread of agriculture from Anatolia into Europe, and is commonly found with haplogroup G2a. H2 was found in Neolithic Anatolia, as well as in multiple later Neolithic cultures of Europe, such as the Vinča culture in Serbia, and the Megalith culture of Western Europe.

The 2021 study "Using Y-chromosome capture enrichment to resolve haplogroup H2 shows new evidence for a two-path Neolithic expansion to Western Europe" found that while H2 is less than 0.2% in modern-day western European populations it was more common during the Neolithic, between 1.5 and 9%. They identified two major clades H2m and H2d. With respect to the current ISOGG nomenclature, H2m appears to be defined by a mix of H2, H2a, H2a1 and H2c1a SNPs while H2d appears to be defined by two H2b1 SNPs, and four additional SNPs which were previously undetected. They estimated TMRCA for H2d and H2m was ~15.4 kya with H2m and H2d estimated TMRCAs of ~11.8 and ~11.9 kya respectively. H2 diversity probably existed in Near-Eastern hunter-gatherers and early farmers, and subsequently spread via the Neolithic expansion into Central and Western Europe. H2d was found along the inland/Danubian route into central Europe, but most H2m individuals are found along the Mediterranean route into Western Europe, the Iberian Peninsula and ultimately, Ireland.

There were also two occurrences of H2a found in the Neolithic Linkardstown burials in the southeast Ireland. More Neolithic H2 samples have been found in Germany and France.

H2 ancient samples
Date	Location	Country	Culture	Accompanying haplogroups	Source
8300-7900 BC	Ain Ghazal	Jordan	Levantine Pre-Pottery Neolithic B	E1b, T1a	
7300-6750 BC	Motza	Israel	Levantine Pre-Pottery Neolithic B	E1b1b1b2, T1a1, T1a2a (PPNB from Jordan)	
6500-6200 BC	Barcin site, Yenişehir Valley	Turkey	Anatolian Neolithic	G2a, I2C, C1a, J2a	
6500-6200 BC	Barcin site, Yenişehir Valley	Turkey	Anatolian Neolithic	G2a, I2C, C1a, J2a	
5832–5667 BC	Старчево	Serbia	Vinča	G2a	
5710–5662 BC	Tell Kurdu, Amik Valley	Turkey	Anatolian Neolithic	J1a2a, G2a2	
5702–5536 BC	Старчево	Serbia	Vinča	G2a	
5400–5000 BC	Szemely	Hungary	Vinča	G2a2a, G2a2b2a1a	
3900–3600 BC	La Mina site, Soria	Spain	Megalithic	I2a2a1	
3900–2600 BC	Boucle sinkhole, Corconne	France	Late Neolithic	I2a1, G2a, R1b-V88	
3500–2500 BC	Monte San Biagio, Latium	Italy	Rinaldone culture/Gaudo culture		
3925–3715 BC	Arslantepe	Turkey	Early Bronze Age	J2a1a1a2b2a, J1a2b1, E1b1b1b2a1a1, G2a2b1, J2a1a1a2b1b, R1b1a2	
3366–3146 BC	Arslantepe	Turkey	Early Bronze Age	J2a1a1a2b2a, J1a2b1, E1b1b1b2a1a1, G2a2b1, J2a1a1a2b1b, R1b1a2	
3336–3028 BC	Dzhulyunitsa	Bulgaria	Bulgarian Bronze Age	G2a2a1a2	
2899–2678 BC	El Portalon cave	Spain	Pre-Bell Beaker	I2a2a	
2470–2060 BC	Budapest-Bekasmegyer	Hungary	Kurgan Bell Beaker	R1b1a1a2a1a2b1	
1881–1700 BC	Alalakh	Turkey	Levantine Middle Bronze Age II	J1a2a1a2, J2b2, T1a1, L2-L595, J2a1a1a2b2a1b	
550–332 BC	Beirut	Lebanon	Iron Age III Achaemenid period	G2a2a1a2, G2a2b1a2, J1a2a1a2, I2a1b, Q1b	

== Modern distribution ==
=== H1a ===
==== South Asia ====
H-M69 is typical among populations of India, Bangladesh, Sri Lanka, Nepal, Pakistan and Afghanistan, in both Indo-Aryan and Dravidian speaking groups.

Haplogroup H-M69 has been found in:

- India - Divided into zones below:
  - North India - According to a study (Trivedi2007) it is found 24.5% (44/180) in both caste and tribal population of North India. Most frequently found : 65.0% among Brahmins from Jaunpur district, Uttar Pradesh, 59% among Uttar Pradesh (UP) Gonds, 44.4% (8/18) among UP Chamar, 38.1% among UP Kurmis, 20.7% (6/29) among UP Rajputs, 18.3% (9/49) among New Delhi Hindus, 18.2% among Kanyakubja Brahmins of UP, 16.13% (5/31) among UP Brahmins, 20.5% among Vaish from Jaunpur district, Uttar Pradesh, 12.1% (5/41) Haryana Brahmin, 11.11% (6/54) among UP Kols, 10.53% (2/19) among Himachal Brahmin, 10.2% (5/49) in Jammu and Kashmir (J&K) Gujars, 9.8% (5/51) in J&K Kashmiri Pandits, 9.3% (4/43) in Haryana Bania
  - South India – 27.2% (110/405) of a sample of unspecified ethnic composition. Haplogroup H is found in high frequencies among Dravidian-speaking Koraga at 87% and Koya at around 70%. Another study has found haplogroup H-M69 in 26.4% (192/728) of an ethnically diverse pool of samples from various regions of India.
  - West India - Among 37.5% (6/16) of Marathas, 33.3% (68/204) of samples from Maharashtra 31.3% (5/16) of Dhangars, 33.3 (16/48) samples of Bharwad of Gujarat 20.69% (12/58) among Gujaratis of Texas, USA. and 13.8% (4/29) among unspecified Gujaratis in India, 26% (13/50)among Dawoodi Bohra, 27.27 (6/22) among Bhils, 20% (3/15) among Chitpavan Brahmins, 15.8% (3/19) in Deshastha Brahmins, 1.56% among Gujarati Brahmins
  - East India - 36.4% (4/11) among Bihar Bania, 30.8% (4/13) in Bihar Kurmi, 28.6% (4/14) Bihar Kayastha, 23.1% (3/13) among Odisha Khandayat, 15% (3/20) among West Bengal Namasudra, 14.81% (4/27) among Bihar Paswan, 10% (2/20) among Bihar Bhumihar, 9.7% (3/31) among Bengalis of West Bengal (WB), 8.3% each for Odia Brahmins and Bihar Rajputs, 5.56% (1/18) among West Bengal Brahmins.
  - Central India - Gondi people of Madhya Pradesh carry around 62.5% of halpogroup H, while Madhya Pradesh Brahmins have it at 23.8%. 21.1% (4/19) of Kshatriyas, 17.6% (3/17) of Brahmins, and 17.1% (4/23) of Shudras carry this haplogroup.
- Bangladesh - 35.71% (15/42) in samples from Dhaka, and 17.72% (115/649) among Bengali samples from various areas of the country.
- Sri Lanka – in 25.3% (23/91) of a sample of unspecified ethnic composition and in 10.3% (4/39) of a sample of Sinhalese.
- Nepal – one study has found Haplogroup H-M69 in approximately 12% of a sample of males from the general population of Kathmandu (including 4/77 H-M82, 4/77 H-M52(xM82), and 1/77 H-M69(xM52, APT)) and 6% of a sample of Newars (4/66 H-M82). In another study, Y-DNA that belongs to Haplogroup H-M69 has been found in 25.7% (5/37 = 13.5% H-M69 from a village in Morang District, 9/57 = 15.8% H-M69 from a village in Chitwan District, and 30/77 = 39.0% H-M69 from another village in Chitwan District) of Tharus in Nepal.
- Pakistan – in 20.5% Kalash, 4.2% Pashtun, 4.1% Burusho and 6.3% in other Pakistanis. Another study has found haplogroup H-M69 in approximately 8% (3/38) of a sample of Burusho (also known as Hunza), including 5% (2/38) H-M82(xM36, M97, M39/M138) and 3% (1/38) H-M36.
- Afghanistan – in 7.1% Tajik., in 6.1% Pashtun.

==== Roma people ====
Haplogroup H-M82 is a major lineage cluster in the Roma, especially Balkan Roma, among whom it accounts for approximately as high as 60% of males. A 2-bp deletion at M82 locus defining this haplogroup was also reported in one-third of males from traditional Roma populations living in Bulgaria, Spain, and Lithuania. High prevalence of Asian-specific Y chromosome haplogroup H-M82 supports their Indian origin and a hypothesis of a small number of founders diverging from a single ethnic group in India (Gresham et al. 2001).

Within the H-M82 haplogroup, an identical 8-microsatellite Y-chromosome haplotype is shared by nearly 30% of Gypsy men, an astonishing degree of preservation of a highly differentiated lineage, previously described only in Jewish priests. (A newly discovered founder population: the Roma/Gypsies - Stanford Medicine 2005)

Important studies show a limited introgression of the typical Roma Y-chromosome haplogroup H1 in several European groups, including approximately 0.61% in Gheg Albanians and 2.48% in Tosk Albanians.

H1a in Roma populations
Population	n/Sample size	Percentage	Source
Bulgarian Roma	98/248	39.5	
Hungarian Roma	34/107	31.8	
Kosovar Roma	25/42	59.5	
Lithuanian Roma	10/20	50	
Macedonian Roma	34/57	59.6	
Portuguese Roma	21/126	16.7	
Serbian Roma	16/46	34.8	
Slovakian Roma	19/62	30.65	
Spanish Roma	5/27	18.5	

==== Europe, Caucasus, Central Asia & Middle East ====
Haplogroup H1a is found at much lower levels outside of the Indian subcontinent and the Roma populations but is still present in other populations:

- Europe - 0.9% (1/113) H-M82 in a sample of Serbians, 2% (1/57) H-M82 in a sample of Macedonian Greeks, 1% (1/92 H-M82) to 2% (1/50 H-M69) of Ukrainians, H1a2a in 1.3% (1/77) of a sample of Greeks. to 7.5% (3/40 H-M82) of Romanians
- Caucasus- 2.6% (1/38) H-M82 in a sample of Balkarians,
- Central Asia - 12.5% (2/16) H-M52 in a sample of Tajiks from Dushanbe, 5.19% (7/135) H-M69 in a sample of Salar from Qinghai, 5.13% (2/39) H (including 1/39 H(xH1,H2) and 1/39 H1) in a sample of Uyghurs from Darya Boyi Village, Yutian (Keriya) County, Xinjiang, 4.65% (6/129) H-M69 in a sample of Mongols from Qinghai, 4.44% (2/45) H-M52 in a sample of Uzbeks from Samarkand, 3.56% (17/478) H-M69 and 0.84% (4/478) F-M89(xG-M201, H-M69, I-M258, J-M304, L-M20, N-M231, O-M175, P-M45, T-M272) in a sample of Uyghurs from the Hotan area, Xinjiang, 2.86% (2/70) H-M52 in a sample of Uzbeks from Xorazm, 2.44% (1/41) H-M52 in a sample of Uyghurs from Kazakhstan, 1.79% (1/56) H-M52 in a sample of Uzbeks from Bukhara, 1.71% (3/175) H-M69 in a sample of Hui from the Changji area, Xinjiang, 1.59% (1/63) H-M52 in a sample of Uzbeks from the Fergana Valley, 1.56% (1/64) H1 in a sample of Uyghurs from Qarchugha Village, Yuli (Lopnur) County, Xinjiang, 1.32% (1/76) H2 in a sample of Uyghurs from Horiqol Township, Awat County, Xinjiang, 0.99% (1/101) H-M69 in a sample of Kazakhs from the Hami area, Xinjiang.
- West Asia- 6% (1/17) H-M52 in a sample of Turks, 5% (1/20) H-M69 in a sample of Syrians, 4% (2/53) H-M52 in a sample of Iranians from Samarkand, 2.6% (3/117) H-M82 in a sample from southern Iran, 4.3% (7/164) of males from the United Arab Emirates, 2% of males from Oman, 1.9% (3/157) of males from Saudi Arabia, 1.4% (1/72 H-M82) of males from Qatar, and 0.6% (3/523) H-M370 in another sample of Turks.

==== East & South-East Asia ====
At the easternmost extent of its distribution, Haplogroup H-M69 has been found in Thais from Thailand (1/17 = 5.9% H-M69 Northern Thailand; 2/290 = 0.7% H-M52 Northern Thai; 2/75 = 2.7% H-M69(xM52) and 1/75 = 1.3% H-M52(xM82) general population of Thailand), Balinese (19/551 = 3.45% H-M69), Tibetans (3/156 = 1.9% H-M69(xM52, APT)), Filipinos from southern Luzon (1/55 = 1.8% H-M69(xM52)), Bamars from Myanmar (1/59 = 1.7% H-M82, with the relevant individual having been sampled in Bago Region), Chams from Binh Thuan, Vietnam (1/59 = 1.7% H-M69), and Mongolians (1/149 = 0.7% H-M69). The subclade H-M39/M138 has been observed in the vicinity of Cambodia, including one instance in a sample of six Cambodians and one instance in a sample of 18 individuals from Cambodia and Laos. A genome study about Khmer people resulted in an average amount of 16,5% of Khmer belonging to y-DNA H.

=== H1b ===
H1b is defined by the SNPs - B108, Z34961, Z34962, Z34963, and Z34964. Only discovered in 2015, H1b was detected in a single sample from an individual in Myanmar. Due to only being classified recently, there are currently no studies recording H1b in modern populations.

=== H2 ===
H2 (H-P96), which is defined by seven SNPs – P96, M282, L279, L281, L284, L285, and L286 – is the only primary branch found mainly outside South Asia. Formerly named F3, H2 was reclassified as belonging to haplogroup H due to sharing the marker M3035 with H1. While being found in numerous ancient samples, H2 has only been found scarcely in modern populations across West Eurasia.

H2 in modern populations
Region	Population	n/Sample size	Percentage	Source
Central Asia	Dolan	1/76	1.3	
West Asia	UAE	1/164	0.6	
West Asia	South Iran	2/117	1.7	
West Asia	Assyrian	1/181	0.5	
West Asia	Armenia	5/900	0.6	
Southern Europe	Sardinia	2/1194	0.2	

=== H3 ===
H3 (Z5857) like H1, is also mostly centered in South Asia, albeit at much lower frequencies.

Like other branches of H, due to it being newly classified it is not explicitly found in modern population studies. Samples belonging to H3 were likely labeled under F*. In consumer testing, it has been found principally among South Indians and Sri Lankans, and other areas of Asia such as Arabia as well.

The following gives a summary of most of the studies which specifically tested for the subclades H1a1a (H-M82) and H2 (H-P96), formerly F3, showing its distribution in different part of the world.

Continent/subcontinental region	Country &/or ethnicity	Sample size	H1a1a (M82) freq. (%)	Source
East/Southeast Asia	Cambodia	6	16.67	Sengupta et al. 2006
East/Southeast Asia	Cambodia/Laos	18	5.56	Underhill et al. 2000
South Asia	Nepal	188	4.25	Gayden et al. 2007
South Asia	Afghanistan	204	3.43	Haber et al. 2012
South Asia	Malaysian Indians	301	18.94	Pamjav et al. 2011
South Asia	Terai-Nepal	197	10.66	Fornarino et al. 2009
South Asia	Hindu New Delhi	49	10.2	Fornarino et al. 2009
South Asia	Andhra Pradesh Tribals	29	27.6	Fornarino et al. 2009
South Asia	Chenchu Tribe India	41	36.6	Kivisild et al. 2003
South Asia	Koya Tribe India	41	70.7	Kivisild et al. 2003
South Asia	West Bengal India	31	9.6	Kivisild et al. 2003
South Asia	Konkanastha Brahmin India	43	9.3	Kivisild et al. 2003
South Asia	Gujarat India	29	13.8	Kivisild et al. 2003
South Asia	Lambadi India	35	8.6	Kivisild et al. 2003
South Asia	Punjab India	66	4.5	Kivisild et al. 2003
South Asia	Sinhalese Sri Lanka	39	10.3	Kivisild et al. 2003
South Asia	Northwest India	842	14.49	Rai et al.2012
South Asia	South India	1845	20.05	Rai et al.2012
South Asia	Central India	863	14.83	Rai et al.2012
South Asia	North India	622	13.99	Rai et al.2012
South Asia	East India	1706	8.44	Rai et al.2012
South Asia	West India	501	17.17	Rai et al.2012
South Asia	Northeast India	1090	0.18	Rai et al.2012
South Asia	Andaman Island	20	0	Thangaraj et al. 2003
Middle East and North Africa	Saudi Arabia	157	0.64	Abu-Amero et al. 2009
Middle East and North Africa	Turkish	523	0.19	Cinnioglu et al. 2004
Middle East and North Africa	Iran	150	2	Abu-Amero et al. 2009
Middle East and North Africa	Iran	938	1.2	Grugni et al. 2012
