= Haplogroup K2 =

Human Y chromosome DNA grouping

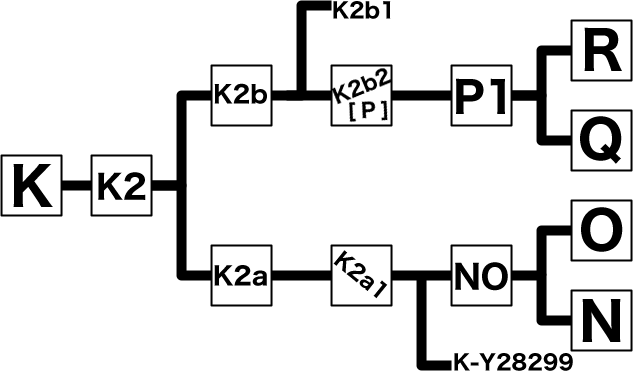
- Possible time of origin: 52,000 years BP or 54,300 years BP
- Coalescence age: 48,700–51,800 years BP
- Possible place of origin: Possibly Middle East, Central Asia or Southeast Asia
- Ancestor: K
- Descendants: K2a (M2308); K2b (MPS); K2c; K2d; K2e.
- Defining mutations: M526/PF5979

Haplogroup K2, also known as K-M526 and formerly known as MNOPS, is a human Y-DNA haplogroup.

Relative to its age, the internal structure of K2 is extremely complex, and subclades of it are carried by males native to regions including Australasia, Oceania, Southeast Asia, South Asia, East Asia, Central Asia, the Americas, Europe, and the Horn of Africa. Many of its branches are very common, the most numerically important being R in Europe and South Asia and O in East and Southeast Asia (as well as recent immigrants to other continents). Haplogroups N and Q, while they are less common overall, are also very widespread, in northern Eurasia and the Americas respectively. M and S are almost entirely restricted to Oceania and eastern Indonesia, where they occur at high frequency. Rare subclades outside of these major lineages are known mainly from Island Southeast Asia (including the Andaman Islands and the Philippines).

Basal paragroup K2* (K-526) has been identified mostly among indigenous Australian males, about 27% of whom carry basal K-M526*. Indigenous Australians and Papuans also carry subclades of K2b1, namely haplogroups M, also known as K2b1a, and S, also known as K2b1b. M and S are the predominant haplogroups amongst living males from New Guinea.

K2a* has been found only in Upper Paleolithic remains from western Siberia and the Balkans, known respectively as "Ust'-Ishim man" and "Oase-1". The only primary branch of K2a, known as K-M2313*, has been documented in two living individuals, who have ethnic ties to South Asia and South East Asia respectively: a Telugu from India and an ethnic Malay from Singapore. In addition, K-Y28299, which appears to be a primary branch of K-M2313, has been found in three living individuals from India. Another subclade, NO (M214)* – which for a time was thought to be synonymous with K2a (M2308)* – has not been identified in living individuals or remains.

Basal paragroup K2b* has not been identified among living males but was found in Upper Paleolithic Tianyuan man from China. K2b1 (P397/P399) known previously as Haplogroup MS, and Haplogroup P (P-P295), also known as K2b2 are the only primary clades of K2b. According to geneticist Spencer Wells, haplogroup K, from which haplogroup K2 descends, originated in the Middle East or Central Asia, and it is likely that haplogroup P subsequently diverged into P1 somewhere in southern Asia; from there P1 expanded into Northern Eurasia and Siberia.

Population geneticist Tatiana Karafet and other researchers (2014) point out that both K2b1 and P* are virtually restricted geographically to South East Asia and Oceania. Whereas, in a striking contrast, P1 and its primary subclades Q and R now make up "the most frequent haplogroup in Europe, the Americas, and Central Asia and South Asia". According to Karafet et al., the estimated dates for the branching of K, K2, K2b and P point to a "rapid diversification" within K2 "that likely occurred in Southeast Asia", with subsequent "westward expansions" of P*, P1, Q and R. However, these authors also stipulated that haplogroup K might have arisen in Eurasia and later went extinct there, and that either origin hypothesis is "equally parsimonious".

== Structure ==
A direct descendant of Haplogroup K, K2 is a sibling of basal/paragroup K* and Haplogroup LT (also known as K1).

As of 2017, the phylogeny of haplogroup K2 is as follows:

K-M526 (K2) M526 – formerly known as K(xLT) and MNOPS

- K-M2308 (K2a) M2308 – found only in ancient remains; see above)
  - K-M2313 (K2a1) M2313
    - NO-F549 (NO*) or K-M2335 F549/S22380/M2335/V4208; M2335/Z4952/M2339/E482; CTS11667
      - NO1-M214 (NO1*) or NO-F176 M214/Page39; F176/M2314; CTS5858/M2325/F346; CTS11572
        - N-M231 (N*) M231; CTS2947/M2175; Z4891; CTS10118
        - O-M175 (O*) M175/P186/P191/P196; F369/M1755; F380/M1757/S27659
    - K-Y28299 (primary subclade of K2a; no phylogenetic name as of 2017) Y28299/Y28355; Y28357; Y28412 – found in one living individual in India
    - K-Y28301 (primary subclade of K2a; no phylogenetic name as of 2017) Y28301/Y28328; Y28358; Y28410 – found in two living individuals in India
- K-P331 (K2b) M1221/P331/PF5911, CTS2019/M1205, PF5990/L405, PF5969 – subclades of K2b include the major haplogroups M; S, P, Q, and R
- K-P261 (K2c)
- K-P402 (K2d)
- K-M147 (K2e). K2c, K2d or K2e – is found mainly in Melanesia, Aboriginal Australians, India, Polynesia and Island South East Asia.

== Distribution ==
At the level of highly derived subclades, K2 is almost universal in some modern Eurasian, Australasian and Native American populations. Haplogroup NO (M214), as a descendant of K2a (M2308), includes most males among Southeast Asian, East Asian, and Finno-Ugric-speaking populations. Similarly, the direct descendants of K2b include the major haplogroups M; S, P, Q, and R. These are now numerically in dominant in: Oceania, Central Asia, Siberia, among Native American populations, Europe, and South Asia.

A rapid diversification within and from K2 (M526), most likely in Southeast Asia, is suggested by estimates of the point in time that K2 branched off from K* (M9). Likewise the branching from K2 of K2b (P331) and Haplogroup P (K2b2 P295) from K2b, as well as Haplogroups Q and R from P (K2b2), and their subsequent expansions westward in Europe, and eastward into the Americas.

K2c, K2d, and K2e are extremely rare subhaplogroups that are found in specific parts of South and Southeast Asia. K2c (P261) has been reported only among males in Bali and K2d (P402) only in Java. K2e (M147), which has been found in two modern cases from South India, was provisionally named "pre-NO" (among other names), as it was believed initially to be ancestral to K2a (NO). However, it was later found to be a primary branch of Haplogroup K2 (K-M526) and a sibling of K2a; the new clade was renamed K2e.

Studies published in 2014 and 2015 found that up to 27% of Aboriginal Australian males carry K-M526*, which could not be classified into a known subclade at the time, and another 27% probably have K2b1a1 (P60, P304, P308; also known as "S-P308") and perhaps 2.0% have Haplogroup M1 – also known as M-M4 (or "M-M186") and K2b1d1.

== Naming ==
The name K2 was introduced in 2014, following dissatisfaction with the previous names.

K(xLT), the name introduced by the Y Chromosome Consortium in 2012 to replace MNOPS, was controversial. Under the previous methodology, a term such as "K(xLT)" designated all clades and subclades that belonged to K, but did not belong to Haplogroup LT; the haplogroups subordinate to MNOPS would likely have been renamed "U", "V", "W" and "X", and MNOPS would therefore have become "MNOPSUVWX". This posed a problem, because there was no way to disambiguate between "K(xLT)" in the broad and narrow meanings of the term.
