= Y-DNA haplogroups in populations of East and Southeast Asia =

The tables below provide statistics on the human Y-chromosome DNA haplogroups most commonly found among ethnolinguistic groups and populations from East and South-East Asia.

== Main table ==
ST refers to the Sino-Tibetan language family. HM refers to the Hmong–Mien language family.

Population	Language	n	C	D	F	K (Note: Most likely K2a(xNO), L, M, N, Q, R, S and/or T)	N	O1a	O1b	O2	P	Q	Others	Source
Achang (Lianghe, Yunnan)	ST (Tibeto-Burman)	40	5.0	0		2.5			≥10.0	82.5		0		Shi 2005; Yang 2005
Aeta (Philippines)	Austronesian	25	0	0	0	0	0	0	0	0	28	0	NO=12; S=60	Karafet 2015
Aini (Xishuangbanna)	ST (Tibeto-Burman)	52	11.5	0				3.8		40.4		0	K(xO1a,O2a,O3,P) =34.6; F(xK)=1.9; O2a=7.7	Wen 2004
Ainu	Ainu	16	12.5	87.5		0	0	0	0	0		0		Tajima 2004
Andamanese	Andamanese	37	0	73.0		5.4	0	0	2.7	5.4	10.8	0		Thangaraj 2002
Balinese (Indonesia)	Austronesian	551	1.8	0		1.1	0	18.1	58.8	6.9		0.4	H=3.4	Karafet 2005
Borneo (Indonesia)	Austronesian	86	22.1	0	2.3	0	0	9.3	20.9	36.0	0	0	H=1.2; R=2.3; S=5.8	Karafet 2010
Chin (Chin State)	ST (Tibeto-Burman)	19							42.1	52.6				Peng 2014
South China	ST, HM	384	9.6	2.1		0.5	4.4	6.8	17.4	57.8		0.3		Karafet 2005
Daur	Altaic (Mongolic)	39	30.8	0		0	≥7.7	≥5.1	20.5	25.6		0	K2a(xN1,O)=2.6; O*(xO1a,O2,O3)=2.6	Xue 2006
Deng (Zayü County)	ST (Tibeto-Burman)	109	1.1	2.2			1.1			94.4				Kang 2012
East Asia	East Asian languages	988	19.9	4.8		1.9	6.4	5.4	16.3	33.7			R1a=2.8	Xue 2006
Filipino	Austronesian	50	0	0		10	0	46		38				Tajima 2004
Filipino	Austronesian	115	5			20		28	3	39			S=2	Scheinfeldt 2006
Garo	ST (Tibeto-Burman)	71	8.5	0					≥11.3	59.2	7.0		H1a=1.4; F(xH,J2,K)=4.2; O(xO2a,O3)=4.2; K(xL,O,P)=4.2	Reddy 2007
Han (China)	ST (Sinitic)	166	6.0	0.6		1.2	9.0	9.6	16.3	55.4		0.6		Karafet 2005
Han (Chengdu, Sichuan)	ST (Sinitic)	34	11.8	0		0	2.9	14.7	17.6	52.9		0		Xue 2006
Han (Meixian, Guangdong)	ST (Sinitic)	35	8.6	0		2.9	2.9	20.0	14.3	51.4		0		Xue 2006
Han (Harbin, Heilongjiang)	ST (Sinitic)	35	14.3	0		0	5.7	2.9	8.6	65.7		0	J=2.9	Xue 2006
Han (Lanzhou, Gansu)	ST (Sinitic)	30	20.0	6.7		0	6.7	6.7	3.3	36.7		0	J=10.0; R1a1=6.7; O*(xO1a,O2,O3)=3.3	Xue 2006
Han (Xi'an)	ST (Sinitic)	34	23.53	8.82			5.88	8.82	8.82	38.24		2.94	R=2.94	Kim 2011
Han (Yili, Xinjiang)	ST (Sinitic)	32	6.3	3.1		9.4	0	9.4	12.5	46.9			R1a1=6.3; P(xR1a1)=3.1; Unknown(xA,C,DE,J,K)=2.9	Xue 2006
Han (Taiwan)	ST (Sinitic)	183	6.3	0.3				22.4	8.5	58.2		1.1		Tsai 2001
Hani (China)	ST (Tibeto-Burman)	34	17.6	0		0	11.8	0	50.0	17.6		0	Unknown(xA,C,DE,J,K)=2.9	Xue 2006
Hezhe (China)	Altaic (Tungusic)	45	28.9	0		0	17.8	0	6.7	44.4		0	K2a(xN1,O)=2.2	Xue 2006
Hmong–Mien (China)	Hmong–Mien	169	8.9	3.6		0	1.2	3.6	22.5	61.5		0		Karafet 2005
Hui (Ningxia, China)	Sino-Tibetan	54					1.9						R1b=3.7; R1a=11.1; J=9.3; L=1.9	Karafet 2001
Northeast India	Tibeto-Burman	173	0.6	1.2		1.7	0			86.7		0	H=2.9	Cordaux 2004
East Indonesia	Austronesian, Papuan	344	61.9	0		10.5		2.6		7.3			S=11; M=4	Mona 2009
Japan	Japanese	259	8.5	34.8	0	0	1.6	0	31.6	20.1	0	0.4	NO=2.3; I=0.4; R=0.4	Hammer 2005
Japan	Japanese	263	5.3	39.2		0	0.8	3.4	34.2	16.7		0.4	0	Nonaka 2007
Japan	Japanese	2390	C1=4.7; C2=6.1	32.2	0.2	1.5	1.3	1.2	33.1	19.7	0	0	0	Sato 2014
Japan (Kyushu)	Japanese	53	7.5	25.7	0	0	3.8	0	35.8	26.4	0	0	0	Hammer 2005
Japan (Tokushima)	Japanese	70	12.8	25.7	0	0	7.1	0	32.9	21.4	0	0	0	Hammer 2005
Japan (Tokyo)	Japanese	56		36.0				3.2	18.0					Poznik et al. (2016)
Japan (Kantō)	Japanese	137	3.6	48.2	0	0	0	2.2	30.7	14.5				Nonaka 2007
Western Japan	Japanese	97	7.2	26.8				4.1	37.1	23.9		0		Nonaka 2007
Java	Austronesian	53	1.9	0		1.9	0	22.6	41.5	22.6			R1=3.8	Kayser 2002
Khalkh	Altaic (Mongolic)	85	56.5	3.5	2.4			0	0	18.8			J=2.4; N1c=4.7; P(xR1a1)=4.7; R1a1=3.5; K(xN1c,O,P)=3.5	Katoh 2004
Korea	Korean	317	9.1	0				4.1	30.3	44.5		0.6		Shin 2001
Korea	Korean	110	15.5	0			5.5	2.7	28.2	45.5			K(xNO)=1.8	Kim 2007
Koreans (China)	Korean	25	12.0	0		4.0	4.0	0	32.0	40.0		0	BT(xC,DE,J,K)=8.0	Xue 2006
Koreans (Korea)	Korean	43	16.3	2.3		2.3		0	30.2	39.5			P(xR1a1)=2.3; J=2.3	Xue 2006
Koreans (Seoul-Gyeonggi)	Korean	110	13.6	0.9			1.8	0.9	28.2	50.9		2.7	L=0.9	Kim 2011
Koreans (Gangwon)	Korean	63	12.7				6.4	1.6	39.7	38.1		1.6		Kim 2011
Koreans (Chungcheong)	Korean	72	11.1	1.4			4.2	1.4	30.6	50		1.4		Kim 2011
Koreans (Jeolla)	Korean	90	13.3	3.3			4.4	1.1	33.3	43.3			L=1.1	Kim 2011
Koreans (Gyeongsang)	Korean	84	16.7	2.4			4.8	2.4	33.3	36.9		1.2	L=1.2; R=1.2	Kim 2011
Koreans (Jeju)	Korean	87	8.1	1.2			6.9	5.8	32.2	43.7		1.2	R=1.2	Kim 2011
South Korea	Korean	506	12.6	1.6		0	4.5	1.8	32.4	44.3		1.4	L=0.6; R=0.4	Kim 2011
South Korea	Korean	706	12.9	2.5		0	3.8	3.1	33.4	42.1		1.8	R=0.1; J1=0.1	Park 2012
Lhoba (Mainling County)	ST (Tibeto-Burman)	61	0	20.8		0	34.6			33.8		0.8	J=0.8; R=7.7; O(xO3)=1.5	Kang 2012
Island South East Asia	Austronesian	312	15.7			24.4		23.7	14.1	18.6			M1=5.4	Capelli 2001
Island South East Asia	Austronesian, Papuan	272	9.9			8.8		20.2	18.7	22.1			S=4; M=3	Kayser 2006
Malaysia	Austronesian	50	6		6	8	0	8	32	30			M=2	Scheinfeldt 2006
Manchu	Sinitic, Tungusic	101	16.8			2.0		3.0	33.7	42.6			O*(xO1,O2b,O3) =1.0; P*(xR1a)=1.0	Katoh 2004
Manchu	Sinitic, Tungusic	35	25.7	2.9		2.9	14.3	2.9	14.3	37.1		0		Xue 2006
Mongolia	Mongolic	149					8.1						G=0.7; J=2.7	Hammer 2005
Mongolia	Mongolic	65	53.0	1.5		1.5	10.6	0	1.5	10.6		4.5	R1=9.1	Xue 2006
Inner Mongolia	Mongolic, Sinitic	45	46.7	0		4.4	13.3	0	2.2	28.9		0		Xue 2006
Naga (Myanmar)	Tibeto-Burman	15								100				Peng 2014
Negritos (Philippines)	Austronesian	64	10.8			50.8				13.8	4.6		O(xM122)=18.5; Others=1.5	Heyer 2013
Oroqen	Tungusic	31	61.3	0		3.2	6.5		6.5	19.4		0	O*(xO1a,O2,O3)=3.2	Xue 2006
Qiang	ST (Tibeto-Burman)	33	0	18.2		0	0	15.2	15.2	36.4			BT(xC,DE,J,K)=9.1; P(xR1a1)=6.1	Xue 2006
Sibe	Tungusic	41	26.8	2.4		4.9	17.1	7.3	2.4	26.8			J=7.3; P(xR1a1)=2.4; BT(xC,DE,J,K)=2.4	Xue 2006
Sulawesi	Austronesian	54	22.2	0	5.6	7.4	0	21.4	13.0	16.7	0	0	R=3.7; M=3.7; S=5.6	Karafet 2010
Sumatra	Austronesian	57	5.3	1.8	0.2	3.5	0	17.5	14	29.8			S=3	Kayser 2006
Taiwanese aborigines	Austronesian	246	0.4	0		0	0	66.3	10.6	11.0				Capelli 2001
Thai	Kra–Dai	34	2.9	2.9		0	0	8.8		35.3			O(xO1,O3)=44.1	Tajima 2004
Tibet	ST (Tibeto-Burman)	156	2.6	51.6		0	4.5	0	0	33.9		3.2	H=1.9; R1a=1.9	Gayden 2007
Tibetans (Lhasa, Tibet)	ST (Tibeto-Burman)	46	8.7	41.3	4.3	0	0	0	2.2	39.1	4.3			Wen 2004
Tibetans (Zhongdian, Yunnan)	ST (Tibeto-Burman)	50	4.0	36.0		12.0		0	4.0	44.0		0		Wen 2004
Tibetans (Yushu, Qinghai)	ST (Tibeto-Burman)	92	14.1	22.8	14.1	21.7		1.1		19.6	6.5			Wen 2004
Tibetans (Guide, Qinghai)	ST (Tibeto-Burman)	39	2.6	48.7	5.1			7.7	0	10.3			J=5.1; R1a1=2.6; P(xR1a1)=2.6	Zhou 2008
Tibetans	ST (Tibeto-Burman)	35	0	42.9		0	8.6	0	0	40.0		0	R1a1=8.6	Xue 2006
Tibeto-Burman	ST (Tibeto-Burman)	964	8.4	18.5	5.4	17.7		3.1	6.3	38.7				Wen 2004
Tujia (Hunan)	ST (Tibeto-Burman)	155	15.5	1.3		12.9		9.7	3.9	53.5	1.9			Wen 2004
Uyghur	Altaic (Turkic)	70	7.1	1.4		7.1	8.6	1.4	0	11.4			Others=63	Xue 2006
Vietnamese	Austroasiatic (Vietic)	46	2.2		2.2	4.4	4.4	4.4	32.6	47.8			NO=2.2	Choi 2017
Yao (Bama, Guangxi)	Hmong–Mien	35	17.1	2.9		0		2.9	40.0	34.3		0	K2a(xN1,O)=2.9	Xue 2006
Yao (Liannan, Guangdong)	Hmong–Mien	35	2.9	0		0	0	5.7	8.6	82.9		0		Xue 2006
Yi (Sichuan, Yunnan)	ST (Tibeto-Burman)	125	5.6	0.8	18	28.0		0.8	7.2	28.8				Wen 2004
Zakhchin	Altaic (Mongolic)	60	46.7	3.3	1.7		N1c= 3.3	0	O2b= 3.3	8.3			R1a1=13.3; O(xO1a,O2b,O3) =8.3; J=1.7; P(xR1a1)=5.0; K(xN1c,O,P)=5.0	Katoh 2004
Zhuang (Yongbei)	Kra–Dai	23	8.7	4.35		4.35		17.39	30.44	17.4			O*(xO1a,O2,O3)=21.704	Chen 2006
Zhuang (Youjiang)	Kra–Dai	5		40					20	20			O*(xO1a,O2,O3)=20	Chen 2006
Zhuang (Tianlin)	Kra–Dai	22						4.55	72.73	9.1			O*(xO1a,O2,O3)=13.64	Chen 2006
Bouyei (Guibian)	Kra–Dai	4				25		25		25			O*(xO1a,O2,O3)=25	Chen 2006
Zhuang (Hongshuihe)	Kra–Dai	39	2.56	5.13		5.13		10.26	12.82	41.02			O*(xO1a,O2,O3)=23.08	Chen 2006
Zhuang (Guibei)	Kra–Dai	21	4.76	4.76		4.76		4.76	9.52	28.58			O*(xO1a,O2,O3)=38.1	Chen 2006
Zhuang (Yongnan)	Kra–Dai	19				5.26		10.53	21.06	42.1			O*(xO1a,O2,O3)=15.79	Chen 2006
Tay (Zuojiang)	Kra–Dai	15		6.67					40	20			O*(xO1a,O2,O3)=33.33	Chen 2006
Zhuang (Shangsi)	Kra–Dai	15						20	66.67				O*(xO1a,O2,O3)=13.33	Chen 2006
Nung (Dejing)	Kra–Dai	3											O*(xO1a,O2,O3)=100	Chen 2006

== Austronesian and Kra–Dai ==
The following is a table of Y-chromosome DNA haplogroup frequencies of Austro-Tai peoples (i.e., Kra–Dai peoples and Austronesian peoples).

Ethnolinguistic group	Language branch	n	C	D (xD1)	D1	F(xK)	M	K (Note: Most likely K2a(xN,O), K2b (which includes M, P, Q, R & S) and/or LT)	O (xO1a, O1b1a1a,O2)	O1a(xO1a2)	O1a2 (M110/M50)	O1b1a1a (xO1b1a1a1a1a)	O1b1a1a1a1a (M111/M88)	O2 (xO2a1a1a1a1, O2a2a1a2, O2a2b1a1)	O2a1a1a1a1 (M121)	O2a2a1a2 (M7)	O2a2b1 (xO2a2b1a1)	O2a2b1a1 (M117)	P (inc. Q & R)
Bolyu	Austroasiatic (Pakanic)	30		3.3				3.3	10.0	10.0	3.3	23.3		30.0			6.7	10.0	
Buyang (Yerong)	Kra–Dai (Kra)	16										62.5	6.3	18.8			12.5		
Qau (Bijie)	Kra–Dai (Kra)	13		15.4				7.7	23.1			15.4		30.8				7.7	
Blue Gelao (Longlin)	Kra–Dai (Kra)	30						3.3	13.3	60.0		16.7		3.3			3.3		
Lachi	Kra–Dai (Kra)	30	3.3		3.3	13.3		13.3	16.7	6.7		10.0		3.3			6.7	23.3	
Mulao (Majiang)	Kra–Dai (Kra)	30	10.0					3.3	13.3	3.3	3.3	63.3		3.3					
Red Gelao (Dafang)	Kra–Dai (Kra)	31	3.2					6.5	22.6	22.6		16.1		12.9				16.1	
White Gelao (Malipo)	Kra–Dai (Kra)	14							35.7	14.3		42.9					7.1		
Hlai (Qi, Tongza)	Kra–Dai (Hlai)	34							35.3	32.4		29.4						2.9	
Jiamao	Kra–Dai (Hlai)	27							25.9	51.9		22.2							
Paha	Kra–Dai (Kra)	32		3.1		6.3		6.3	9.4	3.1		71.9							
Cun	Kra–Dai (Hlai)	31	3.2					6.5	9.7	38.7				38.7				3.2	
Qabiao	Kra–Dai (Kra)	25							32.0	4.0		60.0					4.0		
Caolan	Kra–Dai (Central Tai)	30	10.0					10.0	53.3	3.3		20.0					3.3		
Zhuang, Northern (Wuming)	Kra–Dai (Northern Tai)	22							13.6		4.6	72.7			4.6			4.6	
Zhuang, Southern (Chongzuo)	Kra–Dai (Central Tai)	15							13.3	20.0		60.0	6.7						
Lingao	Kra–Dai (Be)	30						3.3	16.7	26.7		13.3		3.3			10.0	26.7	
E	Kra–Dai (Northern Tai)	31	3.2			3.2		9.7	16.1	6.5		54.8		3.2			3.2		
Lakkia	Kra–Dai (Kam–Sui)	23	4.4	52.2				4.4				8.7		26.1		4.4			
Kam (Sanjiang)	Kra–Dai (Kam–Sui)	38	21.1					5.3	10.5			39.5		10.5			2.6	10.5	
Sui (Rongshui)	Kra–Dai (Kam–Sui)	50				8.0		10.0		18.0		44.0					20.0		
Mak & Ai-Cham	Kra–Dai (Kam–Sui)	40						2.5				87.5		5.0			2.5		2.5
Mulam	Kra–Dai (Kam–Sui)	40	2.5		12.5	7.5		5.0		5.0	25.0	30.0		7.5			5.0		
Maonan	Kra–Dai (Kam–Sui)	32	9.4			9.4		15.6				56.3		9.4					
Biao	Kra–Dai (Kam–Sui)	34	2.9						5.9	14.7		17.7		52.9					5.9
Then	Kra–Dai (Kam–Sui)	30		3.3					3.3	33.3		50.0						6.7	3.3
Tanka (Lingshui)	Sinitic	40	20.0	5.0		2.5		7.5	17.5	7.5	5.0	17.5					2.5	15.0	
Cao Miao	Kra–Dai (Kam–Sui)	33						8.2		10.0		3.0		66.7			12.1		
Amis	Austronesian (Formosan)	28							7.1	42.8	17.8	7.1		21.4			3.6		
Pazeh	Austronesian (Formosan)	21						14.3		38.1	19.1	14.3		14.3					
Siraya (Makatao)	Austronesian (Formosan)	37	2.7					2.7	5.4	70.3		5.4					13.5		
Thao	Austronesian (Formosan)	22						4.6		81.8	4.6			9.1					
Paiwan	Austronesian (Formosan)	22								63.6	27.3						9.1		
Atayal	Austronesian (Formosan)	22								95.5				4.5					
Rukai	Austronesian (Formosan)	11								81.8	18.2								
Puyuma	Austronesian (Formosan)	11								72.7	9.1			9.1					9.1
Tsou	Austronesian (Formosan)	18								88.9	5.6			5.6					
Bunun	Austronesian (Formosan)	17						5.9		17.6	58.8		17.6						
Saisiyat	Austronesian (Formosan)	11								45.5	9.1	9.1	9.1	27.3					
Batak	Austronesian (Northwest Sumatra–Barrier Islands)	13						11.6	19.3	23.1		15.4		23.1					7.7
Bangka	Austronesian (Malayo-Sumbawan)	13	7.7					7.7		30.8		23.1		23.1		7.7			
Malay (Riau)	Austronesian (Malayo-Sumbawan)	13				7.7		7.7	7.7	38.5		7.7		23.1					7.7
Minangkabau	Austronesian (Malayo-Sumbawan)	15				6.7		20.0	20.0			13.3		20.0					20.0
Palembang	Austronesian (Malayo-Sumbawan)	11	9.1							63.6		18.2		9.1					
Nias	Austronesian (Northwest Sumatra–Barrier Islands)	12											8.3	91.7					
Dayak (Kalimantan Tengah)	Austronesian (Bornean)	15				6.7		26.7		20.0	20.0	6.7	6.7	13.3					
Banjar	Austronesian (Malayo-Sumbawan)	15	13.3			6.7				26.7		26.7		26.7					
Javanese	Austronesian (Javanese)	15						26.7	26.7	20.0		13.3		13.3					
Tengger	Austronesian (Javanese)	12	16.7					8.3		33.3		33.3				8.3			
Balinese	Austronesian (Malayo-Sumbawan)	14						28.6	14.3	7.1		28.6		14.3		7.1			
Bugis	Austronesian (South Sulawesi)	15				13.3		20.0		33.3				26.7				6.7	
Torajan	Austronesian (South Sulawesi)	15				13.3		13.3	13.3	13.3	6.7	33.3				6.7			
Minahasa	Austronesian (Philippine)	14					7.1	50.0		21.4		7.1		14.3					
Makassar	Austronesian (South Sulawesi)	13	23.1							30.8	15.4	7.7		23.1					
Kaili	Austronesian (Celebic)	15	6.7					33.3		20.0		6.7		26.7					6.7
Sasak	Austronesian (Malayo-Sumbawan)	15	13.3					13.3	26.7	6.7		20.0		20.0					
Sumbawa	Austronesian (Malayo-Sumbawan)	18						16.7						83.3					
Sumba	Austronesian (CEMP)	14				14.3		78.6						7.1					
Alor	Trans–New Guinea	13	38.5					30.7						23.1					7.7
Cenderawasih (Geelvink Bay)	Austronesian (CEMP)	11	45.5				36.4	18.2											
Cham (Binh Dinh)	Austronesian (Malayo-Sumbawan)	11							9.1	90.9									
Utsuls	Austronesian (Malayo-Sumbawan)	31	12.9						16.1	58.1		3.2					6.5	3.2	

== Sino-Tibetan (Tibeto-Burman) ==
The following table of Y-chromosome DNA haplogroup frequencies of Tibeto-Burman-speaking peoples of western and southwestern China is from Wen, et al. (2004).

Population	n	C-M130	D*	D1-M15	F(xK)	K(xO,P1)	O2 (M122)	O2a2b1 (M134)	O1a (M119)	O1b1a1a (M95)	P1 (M45)
Tibetan (Qinghai)	92	14.13	20.65	2.17	14.13	21.74	5.43	14.13	1.09		6.52
Tibetan (Tibet 1)	75	2.67	33.33	16	2.67	5.33	1.33	32			6.67
Tibetan (Tibet 2)	46	8.7	23.91	17.39	4.35		4.35	34.78		2.17	4.35
Tibetan (Diqing)	27		44.44		3.7	14.81	7.41	29.63			
Tibetan (Zhongdian)	49	2.04	28.57	8.16	2.04	10.2	10.2	34.69		4.08	
Bai (Dali)	61	8.2	1.64	4.92		18.03	16.39	34.43	4.92	11.48	
Lisu (Fugong)	49				2.04	22.45	4.08	61.22		8.16	2.04
Nakhi	40	2.5	37.5			7.5		2.5		5	
Nu	28		3.57			3.57	14.29	71.43		7.14	
Pumi	47	6.38	70.21	2.13		6.38	2.13	6.38	4.26		2.13
Yi (Liangshan)	14			14.29		42.86	21.43	7.14		14.29	
Yi (Shuangbai)	50	8	2	1	38	16	1	1	2	4	
Yi (Butuo)	43	2.33		16.28	4.65	34.88	4.65	27.91		9.3	
Aini (Xishuangbanna)	52	11.54			1.92	34.62	26.92	13.46	3.85	7.69	
Bai (Xishuangbanna)	20	2				3	25	15	1		
Hani (Xishuangbanna)	34	11.76				35.29	32.35	14.71	2.94	2.94	
Jino	36	13.89			5.56	36.11	19.44	19.44		5.56	
Lahu (Simao)	13	15.38			30.77	15.38	15.38	15.38		7.69	
Lahu (Xishuangbanna)	15				6.67	2	33.33	6.67	2	13.33	
Yi (Xishuangbanna)	18	11.11			5.56	33.33	27.78	16.67		5.56	
Tujia (western Hunan)	68	14.71			2.94	10.29	29.41	26.47	7.35	8.82	
Tujia (Yongshun)	38	5.26		2.63		23.68	39.47	10.53	15.79		2.63
Tujia (Jishou)	49	24.49		2.04		8.16	30.61	22.45	8.16		4.08

== See also ==
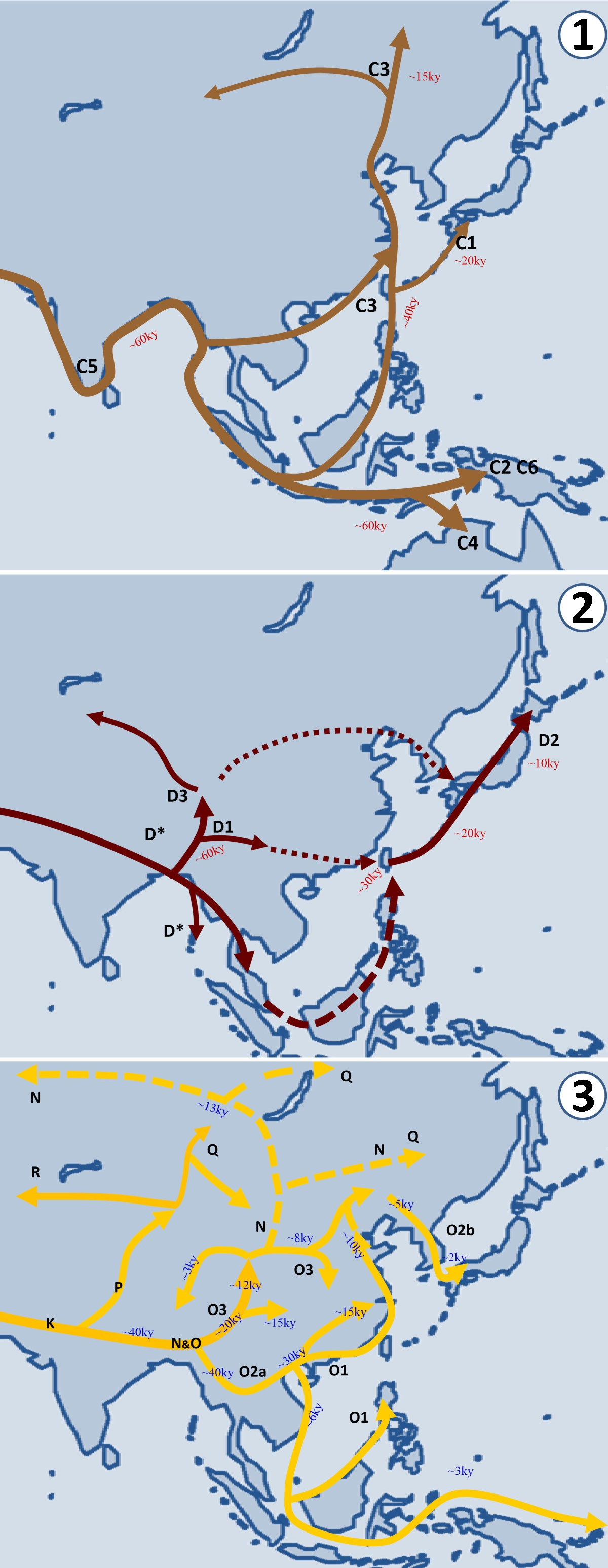
Y-DNA haplogroup migrations in East Asia.

- Y-DNA haplogroups by group
  - Y-DNA haplogroups in populations of South Asia
  - Y-DNA haplogroups in populations of Central and North Asia
  - Y-DNA haplogroups in populations of Oceania
  - Y-DNA haplogroups in populations of the Near East
  - Y-DNA haplogroups in populations of North Africa
  - Y-DNA haplogroups in populations of Europe
  - Y-DNA haplogroups in populations of the Caucasus
  - Y-DNA haplogroups in populations of Sub-Saharan Africa
  - Y-DNA haplogroups in indigenous peoples of the Americas
- Far East
  - East Asian languages
  - Classification schemes for Southeast Asian languages
  - Ethnic groups in Asia
  - Ethnic groups of Southeast Asia
