= Haplogroup K-M9 =

Human Y chromosome DNA grouping

Haplogroup K
- Possible time of origin: 52,000–54,100 years BP
- Coalescence age: 52,000 years BP
- Possible place of origin: Middle East, Central Asia, or Southeast Asia
- Ancestor: IJK
- Descendants: K1, K2
- Defining mutations: M9, P128/PF5504, P131/PF5493, P132/PF5480

Haplogroup K or K-M9 is a genetic lineage within human Y-chromosome DNA haplogroup. A sublineage of haplogroup IJK, K-M9, and its descendant clades represent a geographically widespread and diverse haplogroup. The lineages have long been found among males on every continent except Antarctica. Haplogroup K-M9 is common on all continents except Africa, and is particularly frequent in North Asia, East Asia, Southeast Asia, South Asia, and Europe.

The direct descendants of haplogroup K-M9 are haplogroup K1 (L298 = P326, also known as LT) and haplogroup K2 (formerly KxLT; K-M526).

== Origins ==
Y-chromosome haplogroup K-M9 is an old lineage that arose approximately 52,000 to 54,100 years ago or may be older than 54,300 years ago. Geneticist Spencer Wells had argued that because haplogroup K-M9 has a geographically wide distribution, the lineage probably originated near the central part of this range in the Middle East or South-Central Asia, possibly in Iran or Pakistan, particularly Gilgit-Baltistan.

Basal K-M9* is exceptionally rare and under-researched; while it has been reported at very low frequencies on many continents it is not always clear if the examples concerned have been screened for subclades. Confirmed examples of K-M9* now appear to be most common amongst some populations in Island South East Asia and Melanesia; it is also found in 2% of Italians, with frequencies reaching 8% among the Ladin people. K-M9* was also found in one individual from the Spanish province of Castellón with the surname Ferrer, and is common among the Bnei Menashe, a community of Indian Jews who claim descent from one of the Lost Tribes of Israel.

The primary subclades of haplogroup LT (K1) include haplogroups L (M20), also known as K1a, and T (M184), also known as K1b; both are found at high rates in South Asia, the Middle East, and the Horn of Africa. Some subclades of LT have also been in Europe, at lower rates, since the early Neolithic period (if not earlier).

Basal K2* (K-526) has been identified mostly among indigenous Australian males, about 27% of whom carry basal K-M526*. Indigenous Australians and Papuans also carry subclades of K2b1, namely haplogroups M, also known as K2b1a, and S, also known as K2b1b. M and S are the predominant haplogroups amongst living males from New Guinea. According to Mark Lipson et al. (2014), K2* has also been found at rates of about 14% in two separate groups of Indonesian males: Toba Batak (from North Sumatra) and Mandar (West Sulawesi).

The primary subclades of haplogroup K2 include:

- K2a – Detected in ancient human samples including Oase1 (Romania), Ust'-Ishim (Russia), RNI013, RNI087, RNI010 (Germany) and BK-1653 (Bulgaria). Its descendant subclades include haplogroups N and O, which are commonly found in East Asia, Southeast Asia, Siberia, and Northern Europe.
- K2b – Detected in an ancient human sample (Tianyuan) in Beijing, China. Its descendant subclades include haplogroups M, P, Q, R, and S, which are commonly found in Europe, Central Asia, South Asia, Siberia, Oceania, and the Americas.
- K-P261 (K2c) P261
- K-P402 (K2d) P402
- K-M147 (K2e) M147

== Distribution ==
Reported frequencies of haplogroup K-M9 among sampled regions and populations:

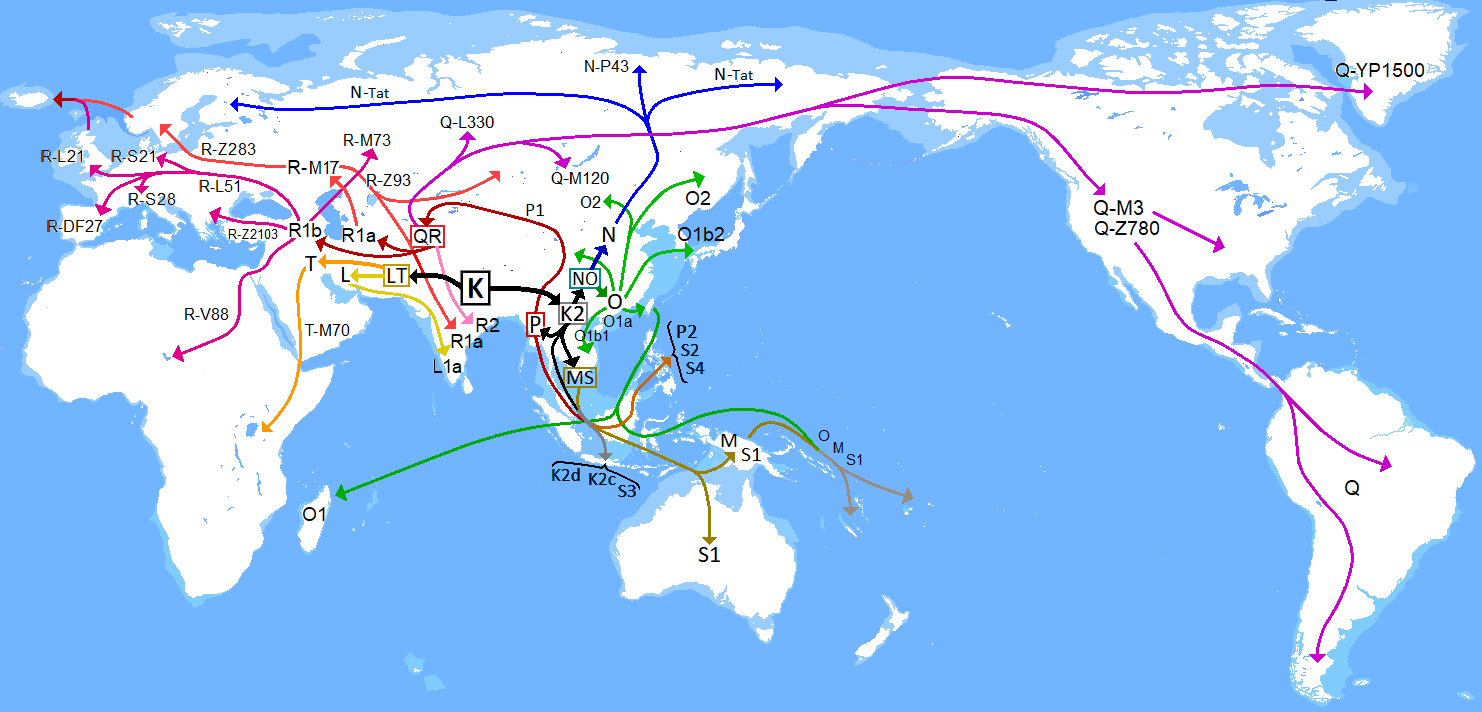
Migration map of Y-chromosome haplogroup K-M9

Region or population	Sample size (n)	Frequency (%)
North Africa	163	5.5
Middle East	940	19.9
Europe	665	57.6
South Asia	496	41.9
Central Asia	396	64.9
North Asia	806	73.6
East Asia	726	77.0
Vietnam	71	88.7
Malay	31	80.6
Aeta	25	12
Filipino	25	88.0
Java	61	86.8
Sumatra	38	86.7
Nias	60	100
Mentawai	74	86.8
Bali	641	89.3
Borneo	86	68.6
Maluku	30	16.7
Sulawesi	177	70.6
Flores	392	18.6
Lembata	92	3.3
Sumba	649	4.5
Alor	27	0
Pantar	26	46.2
Timor	509	17.5
Papua New Guinea	48	6.3
Vanuatu	44	13.7
New Britain	28	0
Micronesia	18	44.4
Polynesia	64	26.6
Australia	44	6.8

== Structure ==
Haplogroup K-M9 tree

- LT (L298; a.k.a. K1) – Basal LT* (K1a*) has been identified in two early medieval remains from Central Europe (i.e. present-day Lower Austria). Subclades are widely distributed at low concentrations. Haplogroup L is found at its highest frequency in India, Pakistan and among the Baloch of Afghanistan. T is most common among: Fulanis, Toubou, Tuareg, Somaliland, Egyptians, some Middle East, the Aegean Islands and among Kurru, Bauris and Lodha in India.
- K2
  - K2* (M526) – Found in an estimated 27% of indigenous Australians (based on large scale surveys in which 56% of the samples were assumed to be non-indigenous). According to Mark Lipson et al. (2014), from Massachusetts Institute of Technology, United States of America, from his journal: "New statistical genetic methods for elucidating the history and evolution of human populations," K2* (M526) has also been found in Toba-Batak and Mandar in an estimated 14%. Only Toba Batak and Mandar have K2* (M526) from indigenous Sunda land.
  - K2a (K-M2308)
    - K2a* – Found only in the remains of Ust'-Ishim man, dating from approximately 45,000 BP and found in
      Omsk Oblast, Russia. (These remains were initially classified, erroneously, as K2*.)
    - K-M2313*
      - K-M2313* – So far found only in one Telugu male and one ethnic Malay, and ancient Oase-1.
      - NO (M214; a.k.a. K2a2) – The two primary branches of NO include the major
        haplogroups:
        • N, which is found mainly in populations across Northern Eurasia (and at lower frequencies in regions including East Asia, Central Asia,
        Southeast Asia, Anatolia, and Southeast Europe) and;
        • O, which is now numerically dominant among males from East Asia, Southeast Asia, and the Pacific Islands.
  - K2b (P331)
    - K2b1
      - S (B254) – Numerically dominant in the highlands of Papua New Guinea; subclades of S1, such as S1a3 (P315) and S1a1a1 (P308), have also been reported at levels of up to 27% among indigenous Australians, while S1a (P405; previously K2b1a) has also been found at significant levels in other parts of Oceania. S2 (P336; previously K2b1b) has been found on Alor, Timor and Borneo and; S3 (P378; previously K2b1c) found among Aeta people of the Philippines.
      - M (P256, Page93/S322; a.k.a. K2b1b, previously K2b1d) – The most common haplogroup in both West Papua and Papua New Guinea; also found in Australia, and neighbouring parts of Melanesia and Polynesia.
    - P (K2b2)
      - P* (K2b2*) – Found in 28% of Aeta (Philippines), 10% in Timor.
      - P1*(M45/PF5962)
        - P1* – Found in 22.2–35.4% in Tuvans, Kizhi, Todjins and also in Andamanese peoples of India.
        - Q (M242) – Found in Native Americans and Siberia/Central Asia (Kets, Selkups, Altai, Tuvans, Xirong, Mongolian Altai Kurgans).
        - - R* – Found only in remains from 24,000 years BP at Mal'ta' in Siberia.
          - - R2 – Found in South Asia and parts of Central Asia, Caucasus and the Middle East
            - - R1a – Found in Eastern Europe, South Asia, Central Asia, and Scandinavia. Ancient samples include 10 out of 11 samples from Xiaohe Tomb complex, Andronovo, Pazyryk, Mongolian Altai Kurgans (R1a/Z93 mixed with Q1a2a1/L54), the Tagar culture, Karasuk culture, Tashtyk culture, some Corded Ware culture.
              - R1b – Found in West Europe, Chadic languages, Banjara tribes of India, Hazaras of Pakistan, Armenian Highlands. Found in several Bell Beakers from Germany and in late antique Basques of whom it is still common in as well as 13.3% (4): one P probably R1b2 (V88): of Guanches from the Canary Islands, reports of King Tut belonging to R1b, by iGENEA belonging to R1b have not been verified.
  - K2c (P261). Minor lineage of Bali.
  - K2d (P402). Minor lineage of Java.
  - K2e (M147). Highly rare lineage; two cases in South Asia.
