= Haplogroup K2b (Y-DNA) =

Human Y-chromosome DNA haplogroup

Haplogroup K2b (P331)
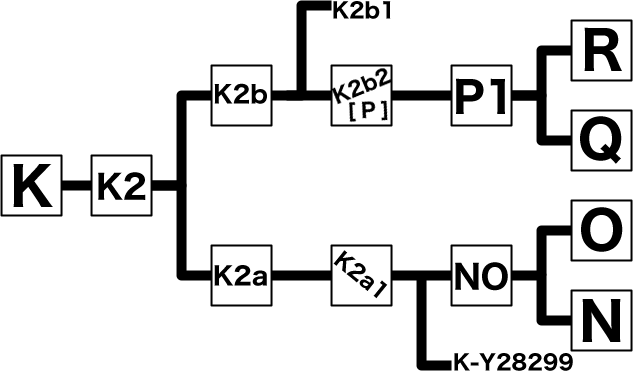
- Possible time of origin: 51,800 years BP
- Coalescence age: 48,900 years BP
- Possible place of origin: Probably South Asia, Southeast Asia, East Asia or Central Asia
- Ancestor: K2
- Descendants: K2b1 (previously known as MS) and; P (K2b2; subclades include haplogroups Q and R).
- Defining mutations: P331, CTS2019/M1205, PF5990/L405, PF5969,

Haplogroup K2b (P331), also known as MPS is a human Y-chromosome DNA haplogroup. According to the age estimates of Tatiana Karafet et al. (2014), haplogroup K2b is around 50,000 years old, less than 3,000 years younger than K.

== Origins ==
Haplogroup K2b is a primary subclade of haplogroup K2. Due to its unusually wide and rapid geographical dispersal, with at least five primary subclades (including K2b) and its basal form (K2*), haplogroup K2 probably emerged in close proximity to K* and K2b. According to the population geneticist Tatiana Karafet et al. (2014), the estimated dates for the branching of K, K2, K2b and P point to a "rapid diversification" within K2 "that likely occurred in Southeast Asia," with subsequent "westward expansions" of P1, Q and R.

Haplogroup K2b is a secondary subclade of haplogroup K-M9. Geneticist Spencer Wells had argued that because haplogroup K-M9 has a geographically wide distribution, the lineage may have originated near the central part of this range in the Middle East or Central Asia, perhaps in Iran or Pakistan.

Basal paragroup K2b* has not been identified among living males, but was detected in the Tianyuan man found in China, an individual dated to the Upper Paleolithic (about 40,000 years BP).

K2b1 (P397/P399), known previously as haplogroup MS, and haplogroup P (P-P295), also known as K2b2, are the only primary subclades of K2b. Karafet and other researchers (2014) point out that K2b1, its subclades and P* are virtually restricted geographically to South East Asia and Oceania. Whereas, in a striking contrast, subclades of P1, namely Q and R, now make up "the most frequent haplogroup in Europe, the Americas, and Central Asia and South Asia".

== Phylogenetic structure ==
- K2b (P331), also known as MPS.
  - K2b1 (P397, P399), similar to the previous haplogroup MS.
    - K2b1a (P405)
      - K2b1a1 (P60)
      - K2b1a2 (P79)
      - K2b1a3 (P315)
      - Haplogroup S (B254), previously known as K2b1a.
    - Haplogroup M (P256), also known as K2b1b.
  - Haplogroup P (P-F5850)
    - P1 (P295/PF5866/S8, 92R7_1, 92R7_2, F91/PF5862/V231)
      - P1a (B253/Z33760/Z33761/Z33762/Z33763), formerly P2.
      - P1b (FT292000)
      - P1c (M45/PF5962), descendant subclades include the major haplogroups Q and R.

== Distribution ==
There is a distinct contrast between the distribution of two, de facto geographical groups comprising, respectively:

- K2*, K2b1 (all subclades), P* (also known as K2b2*; P-P295*) and P2 (also known as K2b2b; P-B253), and;
- P1 (also known as K2b2a) and its descendants, including Q and R.

To the extent that both groups overlap, it is in populations native to the southwest Pacific region, where some Negrito populations carry very high levels of K2b at the subclade level. It is carried, for instance, by more than 83% of males among the Aeta (or Agta) people of the Philippines, in the form of subclades of K2b1 (haplogroups M and S, at levels of more than 60%), as well as P*, P1*, and P2*.

Modern populations with living members of K2*, K2b1 (haplogroups M and S), P* (P-P295*) and P2 (also known as K2b2b) are the predominant haplogroups in New Guinea, some subgroups of indigenous Australians, as well as males native to other parts of Oceania and parts of Island South East Asia.

P1 (also known as K2b2a), including primary subclades such as P1c (P-M45*; previously P1), in modern times, is distributed among populations native to a wide area that includes Europe, Central Asia, South East Asia, and Native Americans.

=== K2b1 ===
K2b1 is found in 83% of males of Papua New Guinea, and up to 60% in the Aeta people of the Philippines. It is also found among other Melanesian populations, as well as indigenous Australians, and at lower levels amongst Polynesians. It is also found in the Melanesian populations of Indonesia.

Major studies of indigenous Australian Y-DNA, published in 2014 and 2015, suggest that about 29% of indigenous Australian males belong to subclades of K2b1. That is, up to 27% indigenous Australian males carry haplogroup S1a1a1 (S-P308; previously known as K2b1a1 or K-P308), and one study found that approximately 2.0% – i.e. 0.9% (11 individuals) of the sample in a study in which 45% of the total was deemed to be non-indigenous – belonged to haplogroup M1 (M-M4; also known as M-M186 and known previously as haplogroup K2b1d1). All of these males carrying M1 were Torres Strait Islanders. The other Y-chromosome DNA haplogroups found were: basal K2* (K-M526), C1b2b (C-M347; previously Haplogroup C4), and basal C* (C-M130).

Population	K2b1 (including haplogroups M & S)
Papua New Guinea	82.76%
Maori	3.82% (1.95% of those sampled, i.e. 49% of Maori males were deemed to have non-indigenous haplogroups)
Fiji	60.75%
Solomon Islands	71.9%
French Polynesia	8%
Vanuatu	76.5%
New Caledonia	
Guam	33.3% (Small sample size)
Samoa	8.04%
Kiribati	0% (Small sample size)
Tonga	20.69%
Micronesia FDR	66.67%
Marshall Islands	63.64%
American Samoa	
Northern Mariana Islands	
Palau	61.5% (Small sample size)
Cook Islands	3.9%
Wallis and Futuna	26%
Tuvalu	36%
Nauru	28.6% (Small sample size)
Norfolk Island	
Niue	0% (Small sample size)
Tokelau	50% (Small sample size)
Hawaii	20% (Small sample size, from FTDNA)
Aboriginal Australians	29%
Timor	25%
Aeta	60%
Malaysia	2.40% (Small sample size)
Flores	35%
Sulawesi	11.3%
Sulawesi	0%
East Indonesia (Lesser Sunda Islands)	25.9%
Java Indonesia	0%
Bali Indonesia	0.9%
Sumatra Indonesia	0%
Borneo Indonesia	5.8%
West Papua (Papua Province, Indonesia)	52.6%
West Papua (Papua Province, Indonesia)	82.6%
Sumba Indonesia	25.2%
Chukkese people Micronesia	76.5%
Pohnpeian people Micronesia	70% (Small sample size)

=== P (K2b2) ===
Apart from the basal paragroup P* (K2b2), it has only one subclade: P1 (M45), also known as K2b2a – which is also the parent of the major haplogroups Q (K2b2a1) and R (K2b2a2).

P (K2b2) descendant haplogroups Q (K2b2a1) and R (K2b2a2) is widely distributed among males of Native American, Central Asian, South Asian and Siberian ancestry.

==== Basal P* (K2b2*) ====
P-P295* (sometimes known as "pre-P", before P-M45 was redesignated P1) is found among 28% of males among the Aeta, as well as in Timor at 10.8%, and one case may have been found in Papua New Guinea (Kaysar et al. 2006) although this has not been verified.

Population	Rate of P* (%)	Notes
Papua New Guinea	0.69	Assumed from Kayser et al. (2006), i.e. one P* found
New Zealand	0	
Fiji	0	
Solomon Islands	0	
French Polynesia	0	
Vanuatu	0	
New Caledonia		
Guam	0	
Samoa	0	
Kiribati		
Tonga	0	
Federated States of Micronesia	0	
Marshall Islands	0	
American Samoa		
Northern Mariana Islands		
Palau		
Cook Islands	0	
Wallis and Futuna	0	
Tuvalu	0	
Nauru		
Norfolk Island		
Niue	0	Small sample size
Tokelau	0	Small sample size
Hawaii	0	Small sample size, from FTDNA
Australia	0	
Timor	10.8	
Aeta	28	
Filipino Austronesian	0	
Malay	0	
Flores	0	
Sulawesi	0.6	
East Indonesia	0	
Java Indonesia	0	
Bali Indonesia	0	
Sumatra Indonesia	0	
Borneo Indonesia	0	
West Papua Province	0	
Papua Province	0	
Sumba Indonesia	3.2	

==== P1 (K2b2a) ====
P1 (M45/PF5962), also known as K2b2a, is hundreds of times more common than P* (K2b2; PxM45), as it includes haplogroups Q and R, is estimated as being 14,300 years younger than K2b.

Many ethnic groups with high frequencies of P1 are located in Central Asia and Siberia: 35.4% among Tuvans, 28.3% among Altaian Kizhi, and 35% among Nivkh males.

Modern South Asian populations also feature P1 at low to moderate frequencies. In South Asia it is most frequent among the Muslims of Manipur (33%), but this may be due to a very small sample size (nine individuals). Cases of P1 (M45) reported in South Asia may be unresolved cases or R2 or Q.

Population group (with ethnolinguistic affiliation)	Paper	N	Percentage	SNPs Tested
Tuvinian (Turkic)	Darenko 2005	113	35.40	P-M45
Nivkh (isolate)	Lell 2001	17	35	P-M45
Altai-Kizhi (Altaians) (Turkic)	Darenko 2005	92	28.3	P-M45
Todjin (Turkic)	Darenko 2005	36	22.2	P-M45
Chukchi (Chukotkan)	Lell 2001	24	20.8	P-M45
Koryak (Chukotkan)	Lell 2001	27	18.5	P-M45
Yupik (Eskimo-Aleut)	Lell 2001	33	18.2	P-M45
Uighur (Turkic)	Xue 2006	70	17.1	P-M45
Kalmyk (Mongolic)	Darenko 2005	68	11.8	P-M45
Turkmen (Turkic)	Wells 2001	30	10	P-M45
Soyot (Turkic)	Darenko 2005	34	8.8	P-M45
Uriankhai (Mongolic)	Katoh 2004	60	8.3	P-M45
Khakas (Turkic)	Darenko 2005	53	7.6	P-M45
Kazakh (Turkic)	Wells 2001	54	5.6	P-M45
Uzbek (Turkic)	Wells 2001	366	5.5	P-M45
Khasi-Khmuic (Austro-Asiatic)	Reddy 2009	353	5.40	P-M45(xM173) §
Mundari (Austro-Asiatic)	Reddy 2009	64	10.90	P-M45(xM173) §
Nicobarese (Mon-Khmer)	Reddy 2009	11	0.00	P-M45(xM173) §
Southeast Asia (Austro-Asiatic)	Reddy 2009	257	1.60	P-M45(xM173) §
Garo (Tibeto-Burman)	Reddy 2009	71	1.40	P-M45(xM173) §
India (Tibeto-Burman)	Reddy 2009	226	3.10	P-M45(xM173) §
East Asia (Tibeto-Burman)	Reddy 2009	214	0.00	P-M45(xM173) §
Eastern India (Indo-European)	Reddy 2009	54	18.50	P-M45(xM173) §
Iran (Southern Talysh)	Nasidze 2009	50	4.00	P-M45(xM124,xM173)
Azerbaijan (Northern Talysh)	Nasidze 2009	40	5.00	P-M45(xM124,xM173)
Mazandarani (Iranian)	Nasidze 2009	50	4.00	P-M45(xM124,xM173)
Gilaki (Iranian)	Nasidze 2009	50	0.00	P-M45(xM124,xM173)
Tehran (Iranian)	Nasidze 2004	80	4.00	P-M45(xM124,xM173)
Isfahan (Iranian)	Nasidze 2004	50	6.00	P-M45(xM124,xM173)
Bakhtiari (Iranian)	Nasidze 2008	53	2.00	P-M45(xM124,xM173)
Iranian Arabs (Arabic)	Nasidze 2008	47	2.00	P-M45(xM124,xM173)
North Iran (Iranian)	Regueiro 2006	33	9.00	P-M45(xM124,xM173)
South Iran (Iranian)	Regueiro 2006	117	3.00	P-M45(xM124,xM173)
South Caucacus (Georgian)	Nasidze and Stoneking 2001	77	3.00	P-M45(xM124,xM173)
South Caucacus (Armenian)	Nasidze and Stoneking 2001	100	2.00	P-M45(xM124,xM173)
Hvar (Croatian)	Barać et al. 2003		14	
Korčula (Croatian)	Barać et al. 2003		6	

§ These may include members of haplogroup R2.

Population group	N	P (xQ,xR)		Q		R		Paper
		Count	%	Count	%	Count	%	
Gope	16	1	6.4					Sahoo 2006
Oriya Brahmin	24	1	4.2					Sahoo 2006
Mahishya	17	3	17.6					Sahoo 2006
Bhumij	15	2	13.3					Sahoo 2006
Saora	13	3	23.1					Sahoo 2006
Nepali	7	2	28.6					Sahoo 2006
Muslims of Manipur	9	3	33.3					Sahoo 2006
Himachal Pradesh Rajput	15	1	6.7					Sahoo 2006
Lambadi	18	4	22.2					Sahoo 2006
Gujarati Patel	9	2	22.2					Sahoo 2006
Katkari	19	1	5.3					Sahoo 2006
Madia Gond	14	1	7.1					Sahoo 2006
Kamma Chowdary	15	0	0	1	6.7	12	80	Sahoo 2006

== See also ==
- Ancient population haplogroups are assumed from small ancient sample sizes.
- † Stands for assumed extinction (no living sample of the same haplogroup).
- Entire phylogeny except for haplogroup X, K2b1 clades, K2* clades, and K2c, K2d, as well as P(xM45).
- Ancient DNA samples.
- Modern populations and ancient Basques.
- Y-chromosome DNA haplogroup X.

== Notes ==
Assuming 70,000 years BP for the TMRCA of M168 chromosomes, we estimate the interval of time between the diversification of K-M9 and that of K-P331 to be less than 3,000 years. This rapid diversification has also been assessed using whole Y-chromosome sequence data. In addition, we estimate the total time between the common ancestor of K-M9 and that of P-P295 to be less than 5,000 years, and the time between the common ancestor P-P295 and that of P-P27 to be around 12,300 years.
