= Haplogroup K =

Haplogroup K may refer to:

- Haplogroup K (mtDNA), a human mitochondrial DNA (mtDNA) haplogroup
- Haplogroup K (Y-DNA), a human Y-chromosome (Y-DNA) haplogroup
