= Haplogroup S =

Haplogroup S may refer to:

- Haplogroup S (mtDNA), a human mitochondrial DNA (mtDNA) haplogroup
- Haplogroup S (Y-DNA), a human Y-chromosome (Y-DNA) haplogroup
