= Haplogroup P =

Haplogroup P may refer to:

- Haplogroup P (mtDNA), a human mitochondrial DNA (mtDNA) haplogroup
- Haplogroup P (Y-DNA), a human Y-chromosome (Y-DNA) haplogroup
