= Haplogroup K2b2 =

Haplogroup K2b2, in human genetics, may refer to:

- Haplogroup P (Y-DNA), a primary clade of Haplogroup K2b
- a rare subclade of Haplogroup K (mtDNA)
