= Haplogroup K2b1 =

Haplogroup K2b1 may refer to:

- Haplogroup K2b1 (Y-DNA)
- Haplogroup K2b1 (mtDNA), a rare subclade of Haplogroup K (mtDNA)
