= Haplogroup P1 =

Haplogroup P1 may refer to:

- Haplogroup P1 (Y-DNA)
- Haplogroup P (mtDNA)
