= Haplogroup M =

Haplogroup M may refer to:

- Haplogroup M (mtDNA), a human mitochondrial DNA (mtDNA) haplogroup
- Haplogroup M (Y-DNA), a human Y-chromosome (Y-DNA) haplogroup
