= Haplogroup X =

Haplogroup X may refer to:

- Haplogroup X (mtDNA)
- Haplogroup K-M147 (Y-DNA), previously known as Haplogroup X; see: Haplogroup K2#Subclades
