= Y Chromosome Consortium =

Geneticist team who work to standardize classification for human Y-DNA

The Y Chromosome Consortium (YCC) was a collection of scientists who worked toward the understanding of human Y chromosomal phylogenetics and evolution. The consortium had the following objective: web resources that communicate information relating to the non-recombinant region of the Y-chromosome including new variants and changes in the nomenclature. The consortium sponsored literature regarding updates in the phylogenetics and nomenclature.

== See also ==
- Human Y-chromosome DNA haplogroup
- International Society of Genetic Genealogy (ISOGG)
