= Haplogroup LT =

Human Y-chromosome DNA haplogroup

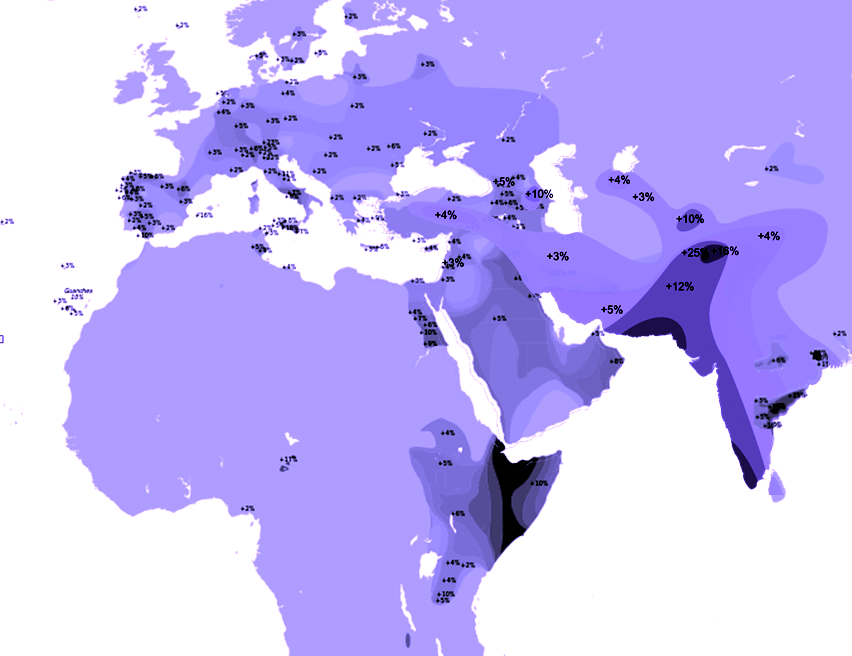
- Possible time of origin: 49,600-41,400 years BP
- Ancestor: K
- Descendants: L, T
- Defining mutations: L298 and P326

Haplogroup LT or LT-L298/P326, also known as K1 (and until 2008 as Haplogroup K2), is a Y-chromosome DNA haplogroup. Its defining SNP mutations are L298 and P326.

K1 (a.k.a. LT) splits into:

- Haplogroup L — mostly South Asian and some Middle Eastern populations
- Haplogroup T — rarer, found in parts of South Asia, the Middle East, East Africa, and Europe

== Structure ==
It is generally believed that LT (L298/P326) originated somewhere in Asia.

LT is a direct descendant of haplogroup K (M9).

The direct descendants of LT are haplogroup L (M20), also known as K1a, and haplogroup T (M184), also known as K1b.

== Distribution ==
The modern distribution of haplogroup L in South Asia and West Asia.

The modern distribution of haplogroup T in Africa, Asia and Europe.

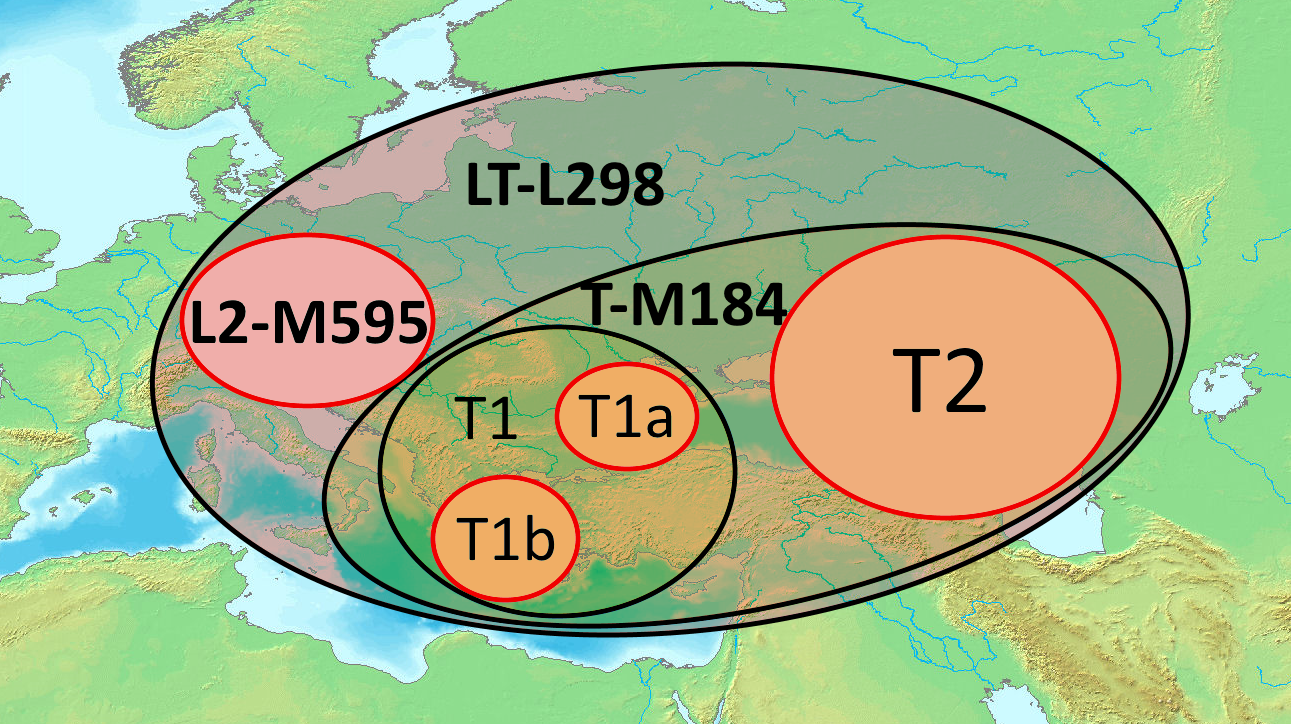
The modern distribution within Europe of haplogroups L and T.

Y-DNA haplogroup LT is an old lineage widely distributed at low concentrations. It was established approximately 30,000-40,000 years ago, probably in South Asia or West Asia.

Its descendants are found mainly in populations indigenous to the Horn of Africa, North Africa, South Asia, West Asia, Central Asia and Europe.

Basal, unmutated LT* (K1a*) has been identified only in two early medieval remains from Central Europe (i.e. present-day Lower Austria).

L-M20 is found at its highest frequency in India, Pakistan and among the Balochs of Afghanistan, and at low frequencies in the Middle East and Europe.

T-M184 is most common in the Horn of Africa, the Nile Valley, the Arabian Peninsula, Iran, as well as in some regions of Central Asia, Eastern India and Europe.

== Pseudoscientific theories ==
The American young-Earth creationist organization Answers in Genesis believes Haplogroup LT to be the direct patrilineal lineage of the Biblical Abraham, a claim not supported by mainstream genetics and archeology.
