= Haplogroup M-P256 =

Human Y chromosome DNA grouping common in New Guinea

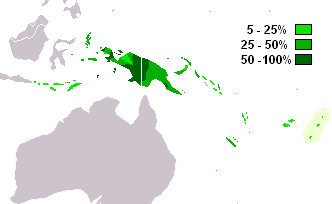
- Possible time of origin: 32,000-47,000 years BP
- Possible place of origin: Wallacea (eastern Indonesia) or New Guinea
- Ancestor: K2b1
- Defining mutations: P256

Haplogroup M, AKA M-P256 and Haplogroup K2b1b (previously K2b1d) is a Y-chromosome DNA haplogroup. M-P256 is a descendant haplogroup of Haplogroup K2b1, and is believed to have first appeared between 32,000 and 47,000 years ago.

M-P256 is the most frequently occurring Y-chromosome haplogroup in West Papua and western Papua New Guinea. In addition, M-P256 is also found in neighboring parts of Melanesia, Indonesia and indigenous Australians.

== Phylogenetic structure ==
This phylogenetic tree of haplogroup subclades is based primarily on the trees published by YCC in 2008 and ISOGG in 2016.

- M* (P256)
  - M1 (M4, M5/P73, M106, M186, M189, M296, P35)
    - M1a(P34_1, P34_2, P34_3, P34_4, P34_5)
      - M1a1 (P51)
      - M1a2 (P94)
    - M1b (P87)
      - M1b1 (M104_1/P22_1, M104_2/P22_2)
        - M1b1a (M16)
        - M1b1b (M83)
  - M2 (M353, M387)
    - M2a (M177/SRY9138)
  - M3 (P117, P118)

== Distribution ==
=== M* (M-P256*) ===
The paragroup M-P256* is found at a low frequency in New Guinea (6.3%) and Flores (2.5%).

=== M1 (M-M4) ===
Haplogroup M-M4
- Possible time of origin: 8,200 [3,800–20,600] years BP
- Possible place of origin: Southeast Asia - Melanesia
- Ancestor: M-P256
- Defining mutations: M4, M5/P73, M106, M186, M189, M296, P35

This group is found frequently in New Guinea and Melanesia, with a moderate distribution in neighboring parts of Indonesia, Micronesia, and Polynesia.

- Una 100%
- Ketengban 100%
- Awyu 100%
- Citak 86%
- Asmat 75%
- West Papua
  - Lowlands/coast 77.5%
  - Highlands 74.5%
- Kombai/Korowai 46%
- Papua New Guinea
  - Coast 29%
  - Highlands 35.5%
- Tolai (New Britain) 31%
- Trobriand Islands 30%
- Maluku (Moluccas) 21%
- Torres Strait Islanders (Australia): up to 2.0% – i.e. 0.9% of samples, when 45% of the total were deemed to be "non-indigenous"

An extreme geographical outlier was apparently identified in a 2012 study, which reported a Hazara individual from Mazar-e Sharif, Afghanistan, with M1 (among a sample of 60 males from the mentioned area). The Hazara individual carried the SNP M186 (which is believed to be equivalent to M4).

Old names (YCC 2002/2008)	M-M4
Jobling and Tyler-Smith 2000	24
Underhill 2000	VIII
Hammer 2001	1U
Karafet 2001	37
Semino 2000	Eu16
Su 1999	H17
Capelli 2001	E
YCC 2002 (Longhand)	M*
YCC 2005 (Longhand)	M
YCC 2008 (Longhand)	M1
YCC 2010r (Longhand)	M1

==== M1a (M-P34) ====
M1a (M-P34) is the most frequently occurring Y-chromosome DNA haplogroup in Western New Guinea. It is also found with moderate frequency in neighboring parts of Indonesia (Maluku, Nusa Tenggara) and throughout Papua New Guinea, including offshore islands.

Old names (YCC 2002/2008)	M-P34
Jobling and Tyler-Smith 2000	24
Underhill 2000	VIII
Hammer 2001	1U
Karafet 2001	37
Semino 2000	Eu16
Su 1999	H17
Capelli 2001	E
YCC 2002 (Longhand)	M1
YCC 2005 (Longhand)	M1
YCC 2008 (Longhand)	M1a
YCC 2010r (Longhand)	M1a

==== M1b (M-P87) ====
M1b M-P87(xM104/P22) has been found in approximately 18% (20/109) of a pool of samples from New Ireland, approximately 12% (5/43) of a sample of Lavongai from New Hanover, approximately 5% (19/395) of a pool of samples from New Britain (and, in particular, in about 24% (15/63) of Baining from East New Britain), in addition to one Saposa individual from northern Bougainville, and another individual from the north coast of Papua New Guinea.

The subclade M1b1 (M104_1/P22_1, M104_2/P22_2) is found frequently in populations of the Bismarck Archipelago and Bougainville Island, with a moderate distribution in New Guinea, Fiji, Tonga, East Futuna, and Samoa.

Old names (YCC 2002/2008)	M-P22
Jobling and Tyler-Smith 2000	24
Underhill 2000	VIII
Hammer 2001	1U
Karafet 2001	38
Semino 2000	Eu16
Su 1999	H17
Capelli 2001	E
YCC 2002 (Longhand)	M2*
YCC 2005 (Longhand)	M2a
YCC 2008 (Longhand)	M1b1
YCC 2010r (Longhand)	M1b1

=== M2 (M-M353) ===
M2 is found at a low frequency in Fiji and East Futuna.

The subclade M2a (M-M177, also referred to as M-SRY9138) has been found in one Nasioi individual from the eastern coast of Bougainville and in one individual from Malaita Province of the Solomon Islands.

Alternative names previously used within peer-reviewed literature for the M2a subclade are listed below.

Old names (YCC 2002/2008)	K-SRY9138/M-SRY9138; AKA M-M177
Jobling and Tyler-Smith 2000	23
Underhill 2000	VIII
Hammer 2001	1E
Karafet 2001	25
Semino 2000	Eu16
Su 1999	H5
Capelli 2001	F
YCC 2002 (Longhand)	K1
YCC 2005 (Longhand)	K1
YCC 2008 (Longhand)	M2a
YCC 2010r (Longhand)	M2a

=== M3 (M-P117) ===
M3 (P117, P118) is found frequently in populations of New Britain, and is also observed occasionally in northern Bougainville, Fiji, and East Futuna.

== Previous phylogenetic history ==
Prior to 2002, at least seven different naming systems for the Y chromosome phylogenetic tree were used within academic literature, leading to considerable confusion. To resolve this, in 2002, major research groups collaborated to form the Y-Chromosome Consortium (YCC). This resulted in a joint paper publication that contained a single new tree as a standard to use by the scientific community. Later, another group of scientists with an interest in population genetics and genetic genealogy worked to continually improve the naming system.

The table below brings together the nomenclature used in Haplogroup M studies, prior to the landmark 2002 YCC Tree, enabling researchers reviewing older literature to quickly convert between the different nomenclatures that were in use.

YCC 2002/2008 (Shorthand)	(α)	(β)	(γ)	(δ)	(ε)	(ζ)	(η)	YCC 2002 (Longhand)	YCC 2005 (Longhand)	YCC 2008 (Longhand)	YCC 2010r (Longhand)	ISOGG 2006	ISOGG 2007	ISOGG 2008	ISOGG 2009	ISOGG 2010	ISOGG 2011	ISOGG 2012
M4	24	VIII	1U	37	Eu16	H17	E	M*	M	M1	M1	-	-	-	-	-	-	-
M-P34	24	VIII	1U	37	Eu16	H17	E	M1	M1	M1a	M1a	-	-	-	-	-	-	-
M-P22/M-M104	24	VIII	1U	38	Eu16	H17	E	M2*	M2a	M1b1	M1b1	-	-	-	-	-	-	-
M-M16	24	VIII	1U	39	Eu16	H17	E	M2a	M2a1	M1b1a	M1b1a	-	-	-	-	-	-	-
M-M83	24	VIII	1U	38	Eu16	H17	E	M2b	M2a2	M1b1b	M1b1b	-	-	-	-	-	-	-
K-SRY9138/M-SRY9138	23	VIII	1E	25	Eu16	H5	F	K1	K1	M2a	M2a	-	-	-	-	-	-	-

The following research teams per their publications were represented in the creation of the YCC Tree.

- α Jobling and Tyler-Smith 2000 and Kaladjieva 2001
- β Underhill 2000
- γ Hammer 2001
- δ Karafet 2001
- ε Semino 2000
- ζ Su 1999
- η Capelli 2001

Karafet's 2008 paper introduced a number of changes, compared to the previous 2006 ISOGG tree. Before the discovery of the P256 marker, the current subgroup M-M4 (defined by the M4 marker) previously represented the whole of Haplogroup M-P256; and subgroups M2 and M3 were formerly classed as subgroups K1 and K7 of the parent Haplogroup K.

== See also ==
- Genetic genealogy
- Haplogroup
- Haplotype
- Human Y-chromosome DNA haplogroup
- Molecular phylogeny
- Paragroup
- Subclade
- Y-chromosome haplogroups in populations of the world
- Y-DNA haplogroups by ethnic group
- Y-DNA haplogroups in populations of East and Southeast Asia
