= Haplogroup P (Y-DNA) =

Human Y-chromosome DNA haplogroup

Haplogroup P (K2b2)
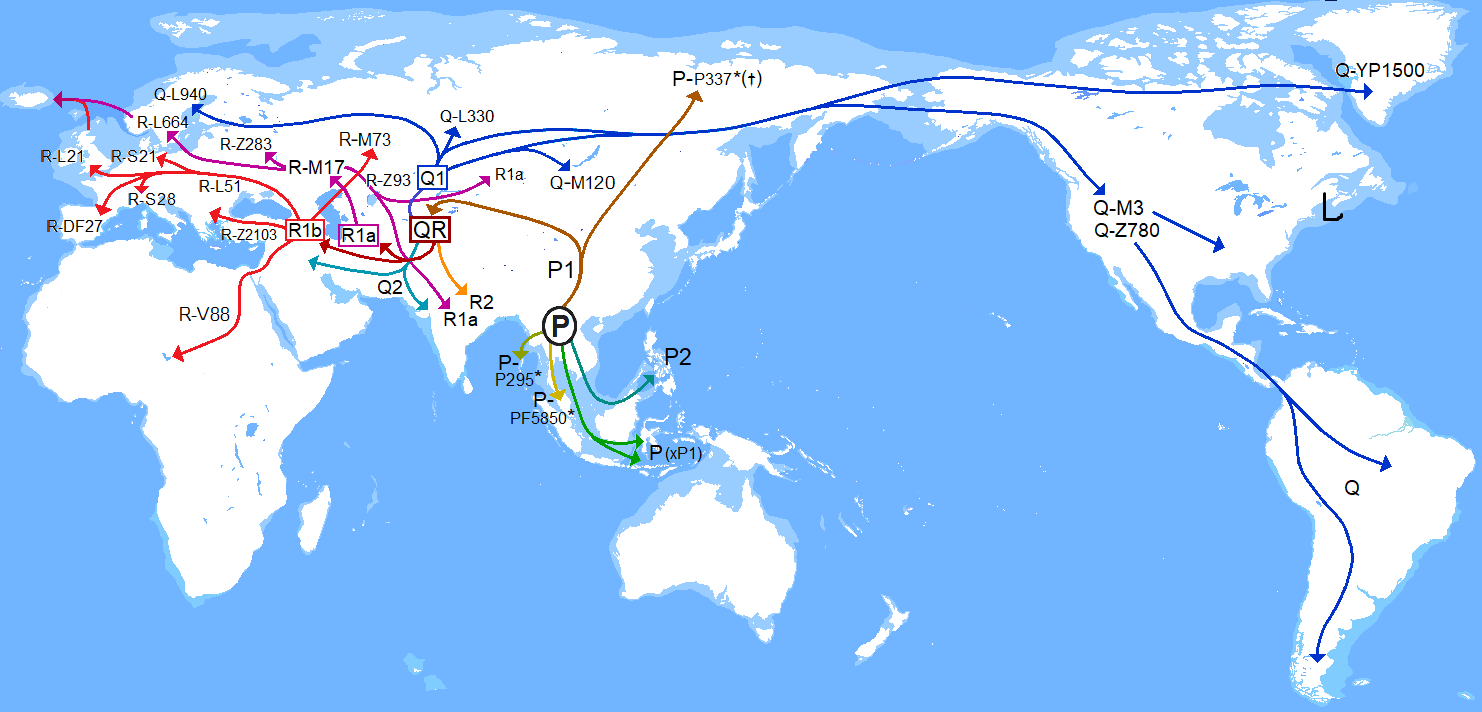
- Possible time of origin: 51,000 years BP
- Coalescence age: 50,400 years BP
- Possible place of origin: South Asia, or Southeast Asia
- Ancestor: PF5850 within K2b
- Descendants: P1 (P-M1254; including P-M45, formerly known as P1 and now known as P1c~); P2 (P-F20148; including P2a~/P-B253, formerly known as P2)
- Defining mutations: PF5850

Haplogroup P also known as P-PF5850 or K2b2 is a Y-chromosome DNA haplogroup in human genetics, it forms a clade within Haplogroup K2b (K-P331). Its sister clade within K2b is K2b1 (haplogroup MS).

While the unique SNP PF5850 is unambiguously downstream of the defining SNPs of haplogroup K2b and upstream of formerly defining SNPs (such as P295), this change is not yet reflected in all guides to Y-DNA phylogeny, such as those by International Society of Genetic Genealogy, nor in scientific publications.

Basal P-PF5850* is found in Southeast Asia. Near-basal P-P295* is found among South and Southeast Asians, as well as Oceanians. P1~* (P-M1254*) has been found only in one Andamanese male, P-FT292000 (P1b, formerly P3) has an unknown distribution, and P1c* (P-M45*) is commonly found among Siberians and Central Asians. P-M45 is the parent node of Haplogroup Q (Q-M242) and Haplogroup R (R-M207).

The major subclades of Haplogroups P-M45, Q and R now include most males among Europeans, Native Americans, South Asians and Central Asians.

== Origin and dispersal ==
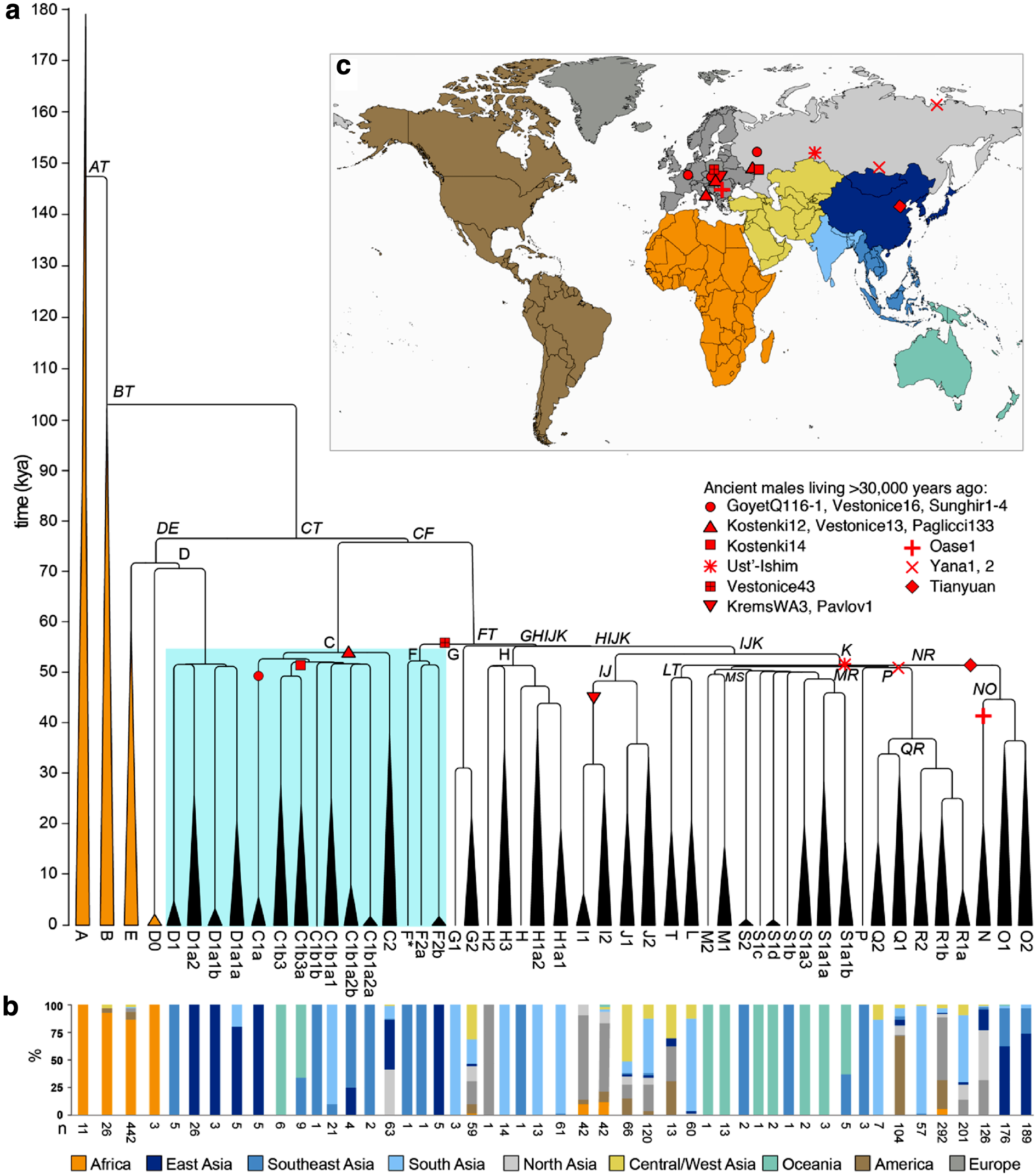
Human Y-chromosomal phylogeny

Karafet et al. (2015) suggests an origin and dispersal of haplogroup P and its ancestral clade K from either South Asia or Southeast Asia as part of the early human dispersal, based on the distribution of subclades of P-P295 and more ancient clades such as K1 and K2. However, Karafet et al. (2015) mentions that this hypothesis is "parsimonious" and K may have alternatively originated elsewhere in Eurasia and later went extinct there. According to a geneticist Spencer Wells, haplogroup K, from which haplogroup P descended, originated most likely in the Middle East or Central Asia. According to Bergstorm et al. (2016), haplogroup K2b1, the ancestor of haplogroups M and S found in Indigenous Australians, and haplogroup P (K2b2), the ancestor of haplogroups R and Q, split in Southeast Asia near Sahul.

The highest frequency and diversity of haplogroup P clades is observed in Southeast Asia, specifically on the Malay Peninsula and the Philippines. To date, the ancestral clade K2b has only been confirmed among the 39,000 year old Tianyuan man.

== Structure ==
The subclades of Haplogroup P with their defining mutation(s):

K2b

- P (PF5850)
  - P~ (P295/PF5866/S8, PF5870/F115/M1189/V1651)
    - P1~ (M1254...)
      - P1c~ (M45/PF5962, P226/PF5879, ...)
        - Q (M242, F4052/M1063/V1090, ...)
        - R (P224, P227, P229, P232, P280, P285, L248.3/M705.3, ...)
    - P2 (F20148, ...)
      - P2a~ (B253/Z33760/Z33761/Z33762/Z33763)
      - P2b (F24883)
        - P2b1 (BY49600/Y145258, ...)

== Distribution ==
(Note: the tilde (~) suffix indicates that subclade names are approximate and may subsequently be redefined.)

=== P* (P-PF5850) ===
P-PF5850* has been found among a sample of Jehai (or Jahai) males in Malaysia.

The near-basal subclade P-M295* (P~*; formerly P*) has been found among at least three living individuals from the Philippines.

=== P(xP1~) ===
This paraphyletic group notionally comprises all subclades of P-P295 (or K2b2) except for the main subclades P1 (PF5962) and P1c (M45), thus also excluding the two major haplogroups Q and R (as subclades of P1c). The tilde (~) suffix indicates that the redefinition of P-M45 from P1 to P1c is relatively recent, as is the discovery of P2 (P-F20148). Thus, it is not always clear if older studies include P1a, P1b or P2 (none of which are defined by the SNP M45). Therefore, some cases reported as P* in older literature may include all subclades of P other than P1 (M45).

P(xP1~) exists at low to moderate levels among various groups in Island South East Asia, the South West Pacific and East Asia.

P(xP1~) is found at its highest rate among members of the Aeta (or Agta), a people indigenous to Luzon who formed from various ancient groups, such as Oceanians and Austronesian peoples from Taiwan. P1*(xQ,R) is most common among individuals in Siberia and Central Asia, as well as in South Asia at a lower frequency.

P(xP1~) frequency in surveyed groups in Island South East Asia, South West Pacific, and East Asia
Population	P* %	Notes
Papua New Guinea	0.69	Assumed from Kayser et al. (2006), i.e. one P* found
New Zealand	0	
Fiji	0	
Solomon Islands	0	
French Polynesia	0	
Vanuatu	0	
New Caledonia		
Guam	0	
Samoa	0	
Kiribati		
Tonga	0	
Federated States of Micronesia	0	
Marshall Islands	0	
American Samoa		
Northern Mariana Islands		
Palau		
Cook Islands	0	
Wallis and Futuna	0	
Tuvalu	0	
Nauru		
Norfolk Island		
Niue	0	Small sample size
Tokelau	0	Small sample size
Hawaii	0	Small sample size, from FTDNA
Australia	0	
Timor	10.8	
Aeta (Philippines)	28	
Austronesians (Philippines)	0	
Malaysia	0	
Flores	0	
Sulawesi	0.6	
East Indonesia	0	
Java Indonesia	0	
Bali Indonesia	0	
Sumatra Indonesia	0	
Borneo Indonesia	0	
West Papua Province	0	
Papua Province	0	
Sumba Indonesia	3.2	

=== P1 ===
==== P1~* (P-M1254) ====
P1~*, also known as P-M1254, is known only from the remains of an Andamanese male who lived during the 19th century. While P1 was previously defined by the SNP M45, the discovery of individuals lacking M45, as well as the defining SNPs for haplogroup P2, has led to the M45 being attached to haplogroup P1c (see below).

===== P1c~ (P-P337) =====
Two long-deceased individuals from Siberia are known to have had P-P337 (P1c~*). One is the remains of an Upper Paleolithic individual from northeast Siberia, known as Yana 1, and the other is the Bronze Age remains known as I6950, from the Okunev culture of southern Siberia. Previously known as P1, this clade is often defined by the SNP M45, however, the YFull phylogeny tree has since excluded M45 because it has been found under at least one haplogroup outside haplogroup P.

===== P1c (P-M45) =====
P1c (P-M45; previously known as P1) has been found among the Ancient North Eurasian Yana individuals, who carried around 29–51% ancestry from an East Eurasian source related to the Tianyuan man (although those particular remains belong to K2b*).

Many modern ethnic groups with high frequencies of P1~, also known as P-M45 and K2b2a, are located in Central Asia and Siberia: 35.4% among Tuvans, 28.3% among Altai-Kizhi (PxQ-M3,R1), and 35% among Nivkh males.

P-M45 (P1~) frequency in surveyed groups of Central Asia and Siberia
Modern population	Modern ethnolinguistic affiliation	Reference	n	Percentage	Notes / SNPs tested
Tuvinian	Turkic		113	35.40	P-M45
Nivkh	Isolate		17	35	P-M45
Altai-Kizhi	Turkic		92	28.3	P-M45
Todjin	Turkic		36	22.2	P-M45
Chukchi	Chukotkan		24	20.8	P-M45
Koryak	Chukotkan		27	18.5	P-M45
Yupik	Eskimo-Aleut		33	18.2	P-M45
Uighur	Turkic		70	17.1	P-M45
Kalmyk	Mongolic		68	11.8	P-M45
Turkmen	Turkic		30	10	P-M45
Soyot	Turkic		34	8.8	P-M45
Uriankhai	Mongolic		60	8.3	P-M45
Khakas	Turkic		53	7.6	P-M45
Kazakh	Turkic		54	5.6	P-M45
Uzbek	Turkic		366	5.5	P-M45
Khasi-Khmuic	Austro-Asiatic		353	5.40	P-M45(xM173) §
Munda	Austro-Asiatic		64	10.90	P-M45(xM173) §
Nicobarese	Austro-Asiatic		11	0.00	P-M45(xM173) §
Southeast Asia	Austro-Asiatic		257	1.60	P-M45(xM173) §
Garo	Tibeto-Burman		71	1.40	P-M45(xM173) §
India	Tibeto-Burman		226	3.10	P-M45(xM173) §
East Asia	Tibeto-Burman		214	0.00	P-M45(xM173) §
Eastern India	Unclear / Various		54	18.50	P-M45(xM173) §
Southern Talysh, Iran	Iranian		50	4.00	P-M45(xM124, xM173)
Northern Talysh, Azerbaijan	Iranian		40	5.00	P-M45(xM124, xM173)
Mazandarani	Iranian		50	4.00	P-M45(xM124, xM173)
Gilaki	Iranian		50	0.00	P-M45(xM124, xM173)
Tehran	Iranian		80	4.00	P-M45(xM124, xM173)
Isfahan	Iranian		50	6.00	P-M45(xM124, xM173)
Bakhtiari	Iranian		53	2.00	P-M45(xM124, xM173)
Iranian Arabs	Arabic		47	2.00	P-M45(xM124, xM173)
North Iran	Iranian		33	9.00	P-M45(xM124, xM173)
South Iran	Iranian		117	3.00	P-M45(xM124, xM173)
South Caucacus	Georgian		77	3.00	P-M45(xM124, xM173)
South Caucacus	Armenian		100	2.00	P-M45(xM124, xM173)
Hvar	Croatian			14	
Korčula	Croatian			6	

§ May include members of haplogroup R2.

Modern South Asian populations featuring P1~ (M45)
Population group	N	P (xQ, xR)		Q		R	
		Count	%	Count	%	Count	%
Gope	16	1	6.4				
Oriya Brahmin	24	1	4.2				
Mahishya	17	3	17.6				
Bhumij	15	2	13.3				
Saora	13	3	23.1				
Nepali	7	2	28.6				
Muslims of Manipur	9	3	33.3				
Himachal Pradesh Rajput	15	1	6.7				
Lambadi	18	4	22.2				
Gujarati Patel	9	2	22.2				
Katkari	19	1	5.3				
Madia Gond	14	1	7.1				
Kamma Chowdary	15	0	0	1	6.7	12	80

==== Q ====
Near universal in the Kets (93.8%) of Siberia. Very common in pre-modern Native American populations and Selkups, where it reaches 50–92%. In Na-Dene peoples it reaches 92.3% in Navajo. It is present in 80% of the Inuit. Also common, at 25–50% in Siberian populations such as the Siberian Tatars, Nivkh, Tuvans, Chukchi, Siberian Eskimos, Northern Altaians, Tsaatan, and in 73% of Turkmens from Karakalpakstan.

==== R ====
The only discovered case of basal R* (i.e. one that does not belong to R1 or R2) is the Mal'ta boy from the Upper Paleolithic, found in the upper Angara River in the area west of Lake Baikal in the Irkutsk Oblast, Siberia, Russian Federation.

===== R1 =====
R1a frequency in surveyed groups by continent and country
Continental	Country	Population	n	R1a1 (Note: SRY1532.2 positive, M17/M198 not tested (%))	R1a1* (Note: SRY1532.2 positive, M17/M198 negative (%))	R1a1a (Note: SRY1532.2 positive, M17/M198 positive (%))	Source
Caucasus	Ossetians	North	134	NA	0.00	0.75	
Europe	Estonia		100	NA	0.00	35.00	
Europe	Romania		335	NA	0.00	17.01	
Europe	Croatia	Krk (island)	74	NA	0.00	36.49	
Europe	Croatia	Brac (island)	49	NA	0.00	24.49	
Europe	Croatia	Hvar (island)	91	NA	0.00	6.59	
Europe	Croatia	Korcula (island)	134	NA	0.00	15.67	
Europe	Croatia	Mainland	108	NA	0.00	26.85	
Europe	Bosnia-Herzegovina	Herzegovina	141	NA	0.00	12.06	
Europe	Kosovo	Albanians	114	NA	0.00	3.51	
Europe	Serbia		113	NA	0.00	18.58	
Europe	Republic of Macedonia	Macedonia	79	NA	0.00	13.92	
Europe	Czech Republic		53	NA	0.00	37.74	
Europe	Belarus	Brest	97	NA	0.00	58.8	
Europe	Belarus		267	NA	0.00	54.7	
Europe	Belarus		50	NA	0.00	42.00	
Europe	Russia	Russians	39	NA	0.00	38.46	
Central Asia	Tajiks, Turkmens		38	NA	0.00	7.89	
North Asia	Russia	Tuvas	104	NA	0.00	7.69	
North Asia	Russia	Altaians	58	NA	0.00	41.38	
South Asia	India	Jammu Jharkhand	61	NA	0.00	37.70	
South Asia	India	Andhra-Pradesh Jharkhand	19	NA	0.00	26.32	
South Asia	India	Madhya-Pradesh Madhya-Pradesh	54	NA	0.00	35.19	
South Asia	India	Khatri-Punjab/Haryana	15	NA	0.00	67.00	
South Asia	India	Ahir-Punjab/Haryana	24	NA	0.00	63.00	
South Asia	India	Uttar-Pradesh Jharkhand	171	NA	0.00	49.71	
South Asia	India	Uttranchal Jharkhand	21	NA	0.00	47.62	
South Asia	India	West-Bengal Chhattisgarh	49	NA	0.00	48.98	
South Asia	India	Asur Maharashtra	88	NA	0.00	5.68	
South Asia	India	Ho Madhya-Pradesh	45	NA	0.00	0.00	
South Asia	India	Mawasi Orissa	27	NA	0.00	3.70	
South Asia	India	Mawasi Chhattisgarh	12	NA	0.00	8.33	
South Asia	India	Mahali Orissa	32	NA	0.00	9.38	
South Asia	India	Santhal Meghalaya	20	NA	0.00	10.00	
South Asia	India	Birhor Meghalaya	27	NA	0.00	3.70	
South Asia	India	Birhor	35	NA	0.00	2.86	
South Asia	India	Baiga	23	NA	0.00	8.70	
South Asia	India	Baiga	42	NA	0.00	2.38	
South Asia	India	Kharia	37	NA	0.00	5.41	
South Asia	India	Savara	21	NA	0.00	9.52	
South Asia	India	Meghwal Rajasthan	50	NA	0.00	30.00	
South Asia	India	Garo	25	NA	0.00	4.00	
South Asia	India	Lohana Gujarat	20	NA	0.00	60.00	
South Asia	India	Khasi	21	NA	0.00	4.76	
South Asia	Iran		87	NA	0.00	10.34	
South Asia	Pakistan	Sindhi	134	NA	0.00	49.00	
South Asia	Pakistan	Mohanna	70	NA	0.00	71.00	
Europe	Turkey		89	NA	0.00	3.37	
Caucasus	Armenia		25	NA	0.00	4.00	
Caucasus	Megrels		67	NA	0.00	8.96	
Caucasus	Abkhazes		162	NA	0.00	9.26	
Caucasus	Avars		42	NA	0.00	2.38	
Caucasus	Chamalals		27	NA	0.00	7.41	
Caucasus	Bagvalals		28	NA	0.00	3.57	
Caucasus	Andis		49	NA	0.00	2.04	
Caucasus	Lezgis		31	NA	0.00	0.00	
Caucasus	Darginians		68	NA	0.00	0.00	
Caucasus	Tabasarans		43	NA	0.00	2.33	
Caucasus	Adyghes		160	NA	0.00	11.25	
Caucasus	Karachays		69	NA	0.00	27.54	
Caucasus	Kumyks		76	NA	0.00	13.16	
Caucasus	Balkars		136	NA	0.00	25.74	
Caucasus	Cherkessians		126	NA	0.00	12.70	
Caucasus	Kabardians		141	NA	0.71	13.48	
Caucasus	Abazas		89	NA	0.00	19.10	
Caucasus	Nogays		87	NA	0.00	12.64	
Caucasus	Karanogays		77	NA	0.00	9.09	
Caucasus	Tats		10	NA	0.00	0.00	
Europe	Crete		193	NA	0.00	8.81	
Middle East	Oman		121	NA	0.00	9.09	
Middle East	Iran		150	NA	0.67	12.67	
Middle East	United Arab Emirates		164	NA	0.00	7.32	
Europe	Turkey		523	NA	0.00	6.88	
Europe	Lithuania	Aukštaičiai	106	45.3	NA	NA	
Europe	Lithuania	Žemaičiai	90	44.4	NA	NA	
Europe	Norway	North	377	27.1	NA	NA	
Europe	Norway	Middle	317	31.5	NA	NA	
Europe	Norway	West	301	24.3	NA	NA	
Europe	Norway	East	493	26.8	NA	NA	
Europe	Norway	Bergen	93	28	NA	NA	
Europe	Norway	Oslo	109	19.3	NA	NA	
Europe	Norway	South	76	13.2	NA	NA	
Europe	Spain/Portugal	Large survey	1140	NA	0.00	1.2	
Europe	Greece	Greeks	92	NA	0.00	16.3	
Europe	Greece	Macedonian Greeks	57	NA	1.80	10.5	
Europe	Albania		55	NA	0.00	9.1	
Europe	Bosnia	Serbs	81	NA	0.00	13.6	
Europe	Bosnia	Bosniacs	84	NA	0.00	15.5	
Europe	Bosnia	Croats	90	NA	0.00	12.2	
Europe	Croatia		89	NA	0.00	27.0	
Europe	Hungary		53	NA	0.00	56.6	
Europe	Czech Republic		75	NA	0.00	41.3	
Europe	Poland		99	NA	0.00	56.6	
Europe	Ukraine		92	NA	0.00	50.0	
Europe	Georgia		66	NA	0.00	10.6	
Europe	Russia	Balkarians	38	NA	0.00	13.2	
Europe	Republic of Macedonia	Albanian language	64	NA	0.00	1.6	
Europe	Croatia	Osijek	29	NA	0.00	37.9	
Europe	Slovenia	Slovenians	75	NA	0.00	38.70	
Europe	Italy	North East	67	NA	0.00	10.4	
-	-	Ashkenazi Cohen	76	NA	0.00	1.3	
-	-	Sephardi Cohen	69	NA	0.00	5.8	
Europe	-	Ashkenazi Levite	60	NA	0.00	51.7	
-	-	Sephardi Levite	31	NA	0.00	3.2	
Middle East	Israel	Ashkenazi	100	NA	0.00	4.0	
Middle East	Israel	Sephardi	63	NA	0.00	1.6	
Europe	Germany		88	NA	0.00	12.5	
Europe	Norway		83	NA	0.00	21.7	
Europe	Germany	Sorbs	112	NA	0.00	63.4	
Europe	Belarus		306	NA	0.33	51.0	
Europe	Spain	Spanish Basques	42	NA	NA	0.0	
Europe	British Crown	Channel Islands	128	NA	NA	2.0	
Europe	England	Chippenham	52	NA	NA	6.0	
Europe	England	Cornwall	52	NA	NA	6.0	
Europe	England	Dorchester	73	NA	NA	4.0	
Europe	England	Faversham	55	NA	NA	2.0	
Europe	England	Midhurst	80	NA	NA	1.0	
Europe	England	Morpeth	95	NA	NA	2.0	
Europe	England	Norfolk	121	NA	NA	2.0	
Europe	England	Penrith	90	NA	NA	2.0	
Europe	England	Southwell	70	NA	NA	4.0	
Europe	England	Uttoxeter	84	NA	NA	0.0	
Europe	England	York	46	NA	NA	2.0	
Europe	Denmark/Germany	Denmark/Schleswig-Holstein	190	NA	NA	8.0	
Europe	Ireland	Castlerea	43	NA	NA	0.0	
Europe	British Crown	Isle of Man	62	NA	NA	8.0	
Europe	Norway		201	NA	NA	12.0	
Europe	Scotland	Orkney	121	NA	NA	7.0	
Europe	Ireland	Rush, Dublin	76	NA	NA	1.0	
Europe	Scotland	Durness	51	NA	NA	2.0	
Europe	Scotland	Oban	42	NA	NA	2.0	
Europe	Scotland	Pitlochry	41	NA	NA	0.0	
Europe	Scotland	Stonehaven	44	NA	NA	5.0	
Europe	Scotland	Western Isles	88	NA	NA	3.0	
Europe	Scotland	Shetland	63	NA	NA	6.0	
Europe	Wales	Haverfordwest	59	NA	NA	2.0	
Europe	Wales	Llangefni	80	NA	NA	1.0	
Europe	Wales	Llanidloes	57	NA	NA	4.0	
Europe	Turkey		523	NA	NA	6.9	
Europe	Italy	Sicily	236	NA	NA	5.5	
Europe	Greece		77	NA	NA	15.6	
South Asia	Pakistan	Burusho	97	NA	NA	25.8	
South Asia	Pakistan	Kalash	44	NA	NA	18.2	
South Asia	Pakistan	Pathan (Pashtun)	96	NA	NA	44.8	
South Asia	Pakistan		638	NA	NA	37.1	
South Asia	Nepal	Tharu from Chitwan District in central Inner Terai ('CI' village sample)	57	NA	0.00	10.5	
South Asia	Nepal	Tharu from Chitwan District ('CII' village sample)	77	NA	0.00	3.9	
South Asia	Nepal	Tharu from Morang District in eastern Outer Terai	37	NA	0.00	16.2	
South Asia	Nepal/India	Hindus (as proxy for Indian ancestry) Chitwan District, Nepal	26	NA	0.00	69.2	
South Asia	India	Hindus New Delhi	49	NA	0.00	34.7	
South Asia	India	Andhara Pradesh tribal	29	NA	0.00	27.6	
Europe	Poland		913	NA	NA	57.0	
Europe	Germany		1215	NA	NA	17.9	
Europe	Germany	Berlin	103	NA	NA	22.3	
Europe	Germany	Leipzig	144	NA	NA	27.1	
Europe	Germany	Magdeburg	100	NA	NA	21	
Europe	Germany	Rostock	96	NA	NA	31.3	
Europe	Germany	Greifswald	104	NA	NA	19.2	
Europe	Germany	Hamburg	161	NA	NA	16.8	
Europe	Germany	Münster	102	NA	NA	7.8	
Europe	Germany	Freiburg	102	NA	NA	10.8	
Europe	Germany	Cologne	96	NA	NA	15.6	
Europe	Germany	Mainz	95	NA	NA	8.4	
Europe	Germany	Munich	95	NA	NA	14.3	
Europe	Greece	Nea Nikomedeia	57	NA	0.00	21.1	
Europe	Greece	Sesklo/Dimini	57	NA	0.00	10.5	
Europe	Greece	Lerna/Franchthi	57	NA	0.00	1.8	
Europe	Greece	Crete	193	NA	0.50	8.3	
Europe	Greece	Crete, Heraklion Prefecture	104	NA	0.00	8.7	
Europe	Greece	Crete, Lasithi Plateau	41	NA	0.00	29.3	
Europe	Greece	Crete, Lasithi Prefecture	23	NA	0.00	17.4	
Europe	Ukraine		94	NA	NA	43.6	
Europe	Belarus		68	NA	NA	45.6	
North Asia	Russia (Altai Republic)	Northern Altaians (Gorno-Altaisk)	20	NA	NA	50.0	
North Asia	Russia (Altai Republic)	Northern Altaians (Kurmach-Baigol)	11	NA	NA	18.2	
North Asia	Russia (Altai Republic)	Northern Altaians (Turochak)	19	NA	NA	36.8	
North Asia	Russia (Altai Republic)	Southern Altaians (Beshpel'tir)	43	NA	NA	58.1	
North Asia	Russia (Altai Republic)	Southern Altaians (Kulada)	46	NA	NA	52.2	
North Asia	Russia (Altai Republic)	Southern Altaians (Kosh-Agach)	7	NA	NA	28.6	
Europe	England	West Lancashire (standard 2-G (Note: The first sample recruited for the study by Bowden, Balaresque, et al., followed the usual sampling strategy: Evidence of two generations of residence in a studied location were sufficient to qualify a donor to participate in the study of DNA localised to a particular geographical area. They contrasted this 'modern' group with a 'medieval' group they recruited, in whom they required additional "cultural markers" of ancestry.))	49	NA	NA	2.0	
Europe	England	Wirral Peninsula (standard 2-G)	100	NA	NA	4.0	
Europe	England	West Lancashire (medieval (Note: For a sample with local (either: West Lancashire; or the Wirral) ancestry likely going back to the time of the Viking influx into Northern England, Bowden, Balaresque, et al. used special inclusion criteria: "Subjects for the second sample ('medieval') were also required to have at least two generations of residence, and to have their earliest recorded patrilineal ancestor born in the relevant area. However, in addition they were required to carry surnames that were present in the relevant region prior to 1572 as judged by documentary sources" — Bowden, Balaresque, et al. (2008)))	42	NA	NA	16.7	
Europe	England	Wirral Peninsula (medieval)	37	NA	NA	13.5	
South Asia	India	South India, Chenchu	41	NA	NA	26.8	
South Asia	India	South India, Koya	41	NA	NA	2.4	
South Asia	India	West Bengal	31	NA	NA	38.7	
South Asia	India	Konkanastha Brahmins, Bombay	43	NA	NA	41.9	
South Asia	India	Gujarat	29	NA	NA	24.1	
South Asia	India	Lambadi	35	NA	NA	8.6	
South Asia	India	Punjab	66	NA	NA	47.0	
South Asia	Sri Lanka	Sinhalese	39	NA	NA	12.8	
North Asia	Russia	Tuvan	40	NA	NA	7.5	
North Asia	Russia	Tofalar	19	NA	NA	5.3	
North Asia	Russia	Buryat	13	NA	NA	0.0	
North Asia	Russia	Yenisey Evenk	31	NA	NA	9.7	
North Asia	Russia	Okhotsk Evenk	16	NA	NA	0.0	
North Asia	Russia	Ulchi/Nanai	53	NA	NA	0.0	
North Asia	Russia	Upriver Negidal	10	NA	NA	0.0	
North Asia	Russia	Downriver Negidal	7	NA	NA	0.0	
North Asia	Russia	Ugedey	20	NA	NA	5.0	
North Asia	Russia	Nivkh	17	NA	NA	0.0	
North Asia	Russia	Kamchatka, Koryak	27	NA	NA	0.0	
North Asia	Russia	Kamchatka, Itel\'man	18	NA	NA	22.2	
North Asia	Russia	Chukotka, Chukchi	24	NA	NA	4.2	
North Asia	Russia	Chukotka, Asiatic Eskimo	33	NA	NA	0.0	
Caucasus	Russia	Abazinians	14	NA	NA	14.0	
Caucasus	Russia	Chechenians	19	NA	NA	5.0	
Caucasus	Russia	Darginians	26	NA	NA	0.0	
Caucasus	Russia	Ingushians	22	NA	NA	0.0	
Caucasus	Russia	Kabardinians	59	NA	NA	2.0	
Caucasus	Russia	Lezgi (Dagestan)	25	NA	NA	0.0	
Caucasus	Russia	Ossetians (Ardon)	28	NA	NA	4.0	
Caucasus	Russia	Ossetians (Digora)	31	NA	NA	0.0	
Caucasus	Russia	Rutulians	24	NA	NA	0.0	
Caucasus	Georgia	Abkhazians	12	NA	NA	33.0	
Caucasus	Armenia	Armenians	100	NA	NA	6.0	
Caucasus	Azerbaijan	Azerbaijanians	72	NA	NA	7.0	
Caucasus	Georgia	Georgians	77	NA	NA	10.0	
Europe	Turkey		39	NA	NA	13.0	
Middle East	Iran	Isfahan	50	NA	NA	18.0	
Middle East	Iran	Tehran	80	NA	NA	20.0	
South Asia	Pakistan	Balti	13	NA	NA	15.0	
South Asia	Pakistan	Brahui	110	NA	NA	8.2	
South Asia	Pakistan	Burusho	94	NA	NA	27.7	
South Asia	Pakistan	Pakistan Hazara	23	NA	NA	60.9	
South Asia	Pakistan	Kalash	44	NA	NA	9.1	
South Asia	Pakistan	Pakistan Kashmiri	12	NA	NA	25.0	
South Asia	Pakistan	Makrani Baluch	25	NA	NA	24.0	
South Asia	Pakistan	Makrani Negroid	33	NA	NA	18.2	
South Asia	Pakistan	Pakistan Parsi	90	NA	NA	26.7	
South Asia	Pakistan	Pathan (Pashtun)	93	NA	NA	10.8	
South Asia	Pakistan	Pakistan Sindhi	122	NA	NA	12.3	
Europe	Albania	Albanian	51	NA	NA	9.8	
Europe	France	French Basque	22	NA	NA	0.0	
Europe	Spain	Spanish Basque	45	NA	NA	0.0	
Europe	Italy	Calabrian	37	NA	NA	0.0	
Europe	Spain	Catalan	24	NA	NA	0.0	
Europe	Italy	Central/Northern	50	NA	NA	4.0	
Europe	Croatia	Croatian	58	NA	NA	29.3	
Europe	Czech Republic/Slovakia	Czech/Slovak	45	NA	NA	26.7	
Europe	Netherlands	Dutch	27	NA	NA	3.7	
Europe	Georgia	Georgian	63	NA	NA	7.9	
Europe	Germany	German	16	NA	NA	6.2	
Europe	Greece	Greek	76	NA	NA	11.8	
Europe	Hungary	Hungarian	45	NA	NA	60.0	
Middle East	Lebanon	Lebanese	31	NA	NA	9.7	
Europe	Republic of Macedonia	Macedonian	20	NA	NA	35.0	
Europe	Poland	Polish	55	NA	NA	56.4	
Europe		Saami	24	NA	NA	8.3	
Europe	Italy	Sardinian	77	NA	NA	0.0	
Europe	Syria	Syrian	20	NA	NA	10.0	
Europe	Turkey	Turkish	30	NA	NA	6.6	
Asia	Russia	Udmurt	43	NA	NA	37.2	
Europe	Ukraine	Ukrainian	50	NA	NA	54.0	
South Asia	Pakistan		85	NA	NA	16.5	
South Asia	India	Rajput (of Rajasthan)	29	NA	NA	31.3	
South Asia	Pakistan	Southern	91	NA	NA	31.9	
Southeast Asia	Cambodia		6	NA	NA	0.0	
East Asia	China		128	NA	NA	0.0	
East Asia	Japan		23	NA	NA	0.0	
North Asia	Siberia		18	NA	NA	0.0	
South Asia	India	Tribe (Austro-Asiatic)	64	NA	NA	0.0	
South Asia	India	Tribe (Dravidian)	18	NA	NA	2.8	
South Asia	India	Tribe (Tibeto-Burman)	87	NA	NA	4.6	
South Asia	India	Tribe (Indo-European)	21	NA	NA	19.1	
South Asia	India	Dravidian Upper Caste	59	NA	NA	28.8	
South Asia	India	Dravidian Middle Caste	85	NA	NA	11.8	
South Asia	India	Dravidian Lower Caste	29	NA	NA	24.1	
South Asia	India	Indo-European Upper Caste	86	NA	NA	45.4	
South Asia	India	Indo-European Middle Caste	48	NA	NA	50.4	
South Asia	India	Indo-European Lower Caste	50	NA	NA	26.0	
South Asia	India	Kashmiri Gujars	49	NA	0.00	40.86	
South Asia	India	Kashmiri Pandits	51	NA	3.92	19.61	
South Asia	India	Gujarat Brahmins	64	NA	0.00	32.81	
South Asia	India	Bihar Paswan	27	NA	0.00	40.74	
South Asia	India	Bihar Brahmins	38	NA	0.00	60.53	
South Asia	India	Himachal Pradesh Brahmin	30	NA	0.00	47.37	
South Asia	India	Indian Punjab Brahmins	49	NA	0.00	35.71	
South Asia	India	West Bengal Brahmins	30	NA	0.00	72.22	
South Asia	India	Uttar Pradesh Brahmins	31	NA	0.00	67.74	
South Asia	India	Uttar Pradesh Kols	38	NA	0.00	14.81	
South Asia	India	Madhya Pradesh Saharia	57	NA	22.8	28.07	
South Asia	India	Madhya Pradesh Brahmins	42	NA	0.00	38.1	
South Asia	India	Maharashtra Brahmins	32	NA	0.00	43.33	
Europe	Moldova	Moldavians, Carahasani	72	NA	NA	34.7	
Europe	Moldava	Moldavians Sofia, Drochia, Moldava	54	NA	NA	20.4	
Europe	Romania	Dniester-Carpathian region	-	NA	NA	20.4	
Europe	Ukraine	Ukrainians, Rașcov (Rashkovo), Camenca district	53	NA	NA	41.5	
Europe	Moldava	Gagauzes, Kongaz	48	NA	NA	12.5	
Europe	Ukraine	Gagauzes, Etulia	41	NA	NA	26.8	
East Asia	China	Dongxiang (Mongolian descent)	49			28.0	
East Asia	China	Salar (Central Asian Turkic descent)	52	NA		17.0	
East Asia	China	Bo\'an (Bonan) Mongolic descent	47	NA		26.0	
Caucasus	Armenia	Ararat	44	NA	0.00	0.0	
Caucasus	Armenia/Georgia	Northern Armenians	189	NA	0.53	4.2	
Caucasus	Armenia	Syunik (South Armenia)	140	NA	0.00	9.3	
Caucasus	Azerbaijan/Armenia	Karabakh	215	NA	0.00	5.6	
Middle East	Iran	Isfahan, New Julfa, (Armenian descent)	56	NA	0.00	1.8	
Europe	Turkey	Near Armenia	90	NA	1.11	3.3	
Europe	Turkey	Istanbul University	173	NA	0.00	10.4	
Caucasus	Azerbaijan	Baku	29	NA	0.00	10.3	
Middle East	Syria	Damascus University	44	NA	0.00	2.3	
Caucasus	Georgia	Tbilisi	68	NA	0.00	4.4	
Europe	Greece	Athens	132	NA	0.00	6.1	
Europe	Mongolia	soldiers mainly from Khalkh	402	NA	0.00	2.5	
Europe	Hungary		215	NA	1.40	24.2	
Europe	Wales	North Wales	98	NA	NA	1.0	
Europe	England	English Midlands	136	NA	NA	4.4	
Europe	England	East Anglia	173	NA	NA	4.6	
Europe	Netherlands	Friesland	94	NA	NA	7.4	
Europe	Norway		83	NA	NA	21.7	
Europe	United Kingdom	British	25	NA	NA	0.0	
Europe	Scotland	Orkney	26	NA	NA	27.0	
Europe	Russia	Pomor	28	NA	NA	36.0	
Europe	Russia	Russian, North	49	NA	NA	43.0	
Asia	Russia	Russian, Tashkent	89	NA	NA	47.0	
Europe	Russia	Kazan Tatar	38	NA	NA	24.0	
Europe	Russia	Saami	23	NA	NA	22.0	
Asia	Russia	Nenets	54	NA	NA	11.0	
Middle East	Lebanon		50	NA	NA	0.0	
Middle East	Iran	Tehran	24	NA	NA	4.0	
Middle East	Iran	Shiraz	12	NA	NA	0.0	
Middle East	Iran	Esfahan	16	NA	NA	0.0	
Caucasus	Georgia	Svans (Svanetians)	25	NA	NA	8.0	
Caucasus	Georgia	Kazbegi	25	NA	NA	4.0	
Caucasus	Georgia	South Ossetians	17	NA	NA	6.0	
Caucasus	Azerbaijan	Lezgi in Azerbaijan	12	NA	NA	8.0	
Caucasus	Azerbaijan	Azerbaijanians	21	NA	NA	10.0	
Caucasus	Armenia	Armenians	47	NA	NA	9.0	
Central Asia	Afghanistan	Pashtuns	49	NA	NA	51.02	
Central Asia	Afghanistan	Tajiks	56	NA	NA	30.36	
Central Asia	Afghanistan	Hazara	60	NA	NA	6.66	
Central Asia	Afghanistan	Uzbeks	17	NA	NA	17.64	
Central Asia	Afghanistan	Balochs	13	NA	NA	0.0	
Central Asia	Afghanistan	Nuristanis	5	NA	NA	60.0	
Central Asia	Turkmenistan	Turkmen	30	NA	NA	7.0	
Central Asia	Turkmenistan	Turkmenistan Kurd	17	NA	NA	12.0	
Central Asia	Uzbekistan	Sinte Romani	15	NA	NA	0.0	
Central Asia	Uzbekistan	Iranian (Samarkand)	53	NA	NA	11.0	
Central Asia	Uzbekistan	Tajik (Samarkand)	40	NA	NA	25.0	
Central Asia	Uzbekistan	Arab Bukhara	42	NA	NA	19.0	
Central Asia	Uzbekistan	Crimean Tatar	22	NA	NA	32.0	
Central Asia	Uzbekistan	Karakalpak	44	NA	NA	18.0	
Central Asia	Uzbekistan	Uzbek/ Kashkadarya	19	NA	NA	16.0	
Central Asia	Uzbekistan	Uzbek/ Bukhara	58	NA	NA	28.0	
Central Asia	Uzbekistan	Uzbek/ Surkhandarya	68	NA	NA	29.0	
Central Asia	Uzbekistan	Uzbek/ Khorezm	70	NA	NA	30.0	
Central Asia	Uzbekistan	Uzbek/ Tashkent	43	NA	NA	28.0	
Central Asia	Uzbekistan	Uzbek/ Fergana Valley	63	NA	NA	22.0	
Central Asia	Uzbekistan	Samarkand	45	NA	NA	13.0	
Central Asia	Tajikistan	Near Afghanistan	25	NA	NA	68.0	
Central Asia	Tajikistan	Bartangi	30	NA	NA	40.0	
Central Asia	Tajikistan	Shugnan	44	NA	NA	23.0	
Central Asia	Tajikistan	Yagnobi	31	NA	NA	16.0	
Central Asia	Tajikistan	Tajiks/Panjikent	22	NA	NA	64.0	
Central Asia	Tajikistan	Tajiks/Dushanbe	16	NA	NA	19.0	
Central Asia	Kyrgyzstan	Kyrgyz	52	NA	NA	63.0	
Central Asia	Kyrgyzstan	Dungan (Sino-Tibetan)	40	NA	NA	10.0	
Central Asia	Kazakhstan	Kazakhs	54	NA	NA	4.0	
Central Asia	Kazakhstan	Uighur	41	NA	NA	22.0	
South Asia	India	South India Sourashtran	46	NA	NA	39.0	
South Asia	India	South India Kallar Dravidian	84	NA	NA	4.0	
South Asia	India	South India Yadhava	129	NA	NA	13.0	
North Asia	Russia	Tuvinian	42	NA	NA	14.0	
North Asia	Mongolia		24	NA	NA	4.0	
East Asia	Korea		45	NA	NA	0.0	
East Asia	China	Liqian from Yongchang	87	NA	NA	1.1	
East Asia	China	Yugur from Sunan in Gansu	52	NA	NA	1.9	
East Asia	China	Tibetan from Guide, Qinghai	39	NA	NA	2.6	
East Asia	China	Uyghurs from Urumqi	49	NA	NA	NA	
Europe	Italy	Sardinia	10	0.0	NA	NA	
Europe	England	Cornwall	51	0.0	NA	NA	
Europe	Spain	Basque	26	0.0	NA	NA	
Europe	Portugal	Northern	328	0.0	NA	NA	
North Africa	Algeria		27	0.0	NA	NA	
North Africa			129	0.0	NA	NA	
North Africa	Tunisia	'Jerbian' Arabs (from the island of Djerba)	46	NA	4.3	4.3	
Europe	Finland		57	10.0	NA	NA	
Europe	Bulgaria		24	12.0	NA	NA	
Europe	Netherlands		84	13.0	NA	NA	
Europe	Germany	Bavarian	80	15.0	NA	NA	
Europe	Sweden	Gotlander	64	16.0	NA	NA	
Europe		Yugoslavian	100	16.0	NA	NA	
Europe	Russia	Chuvash	17	18.0	NA	NA	
Europe	Sweden	Northern	48	19.0	NA	NA	
Europe	Romania		45	20.0	NA	NA	
Europe	Iceland		28	21.0	NA	NA	
Europe		Saami	48	21.0	NA	NA	
Europe	Hungary		36	22.0	NA	NA	
Europe	Estonia		207	27.0	NA	NA	
Europe	Russia	Mari	48	29.0 (Tambets disagrees)	NA	NA	
Europe	Ukraine	Ukraine	27	30.0	NA	NA	
Europe	Germany		30	30.0	NA	NA	
Europe	Norway		52	31.0	NA	NA	
Europe	Lithuania		38	34.0	NA	NA	
Europe	Slovenia		70	37.0	NA	NA	
Europe	Czech Republic		53	38.0	NA	NA	
Europe	Belarus		41	39.0	NA	NA	
Europe	Latvia		34	41.0	NA	NA	
Asia	Russia		122	47.0	NA	NA	
Europe	Slovakia		70	47.0	NA	NA	
Europe	Poland		112	54.0	NA	NA	
Europe	Ireland		57	1.0	NA	NA	
Europe	Ossetia		47	2.0	NA	NA	
Europe	Cyprus		45	2.0	NA	NA	
Europe	Italy		99	2.0	NA	NA	
Europe	Spain		126	2.0	NA	NA	
Europe	Portugal	Southern	57	2.0	NA	NA	
Europe	Belgium		92	4.0	NA	NA	
Europe	Turkey		167	5.0	NA	NA	
Europe	France		40	5.0	NA	NA	
Europe	Georgia		64	6.0	NA	NA	
Europe	Armenia		89	6.0	NA	NA	
Europe	Denmark		56	7.0	NA	NA	
Europe	Scotland	Western	120	7.0	NA	NA	
Europe	Scotland		43	7.0	NA	NA	
Europe	Greece		36	8.0	NA	NA	
Europe	England	East Anglia	172	9.0	NA	NA	
Europe	Iceland		181	23.8	NA	NA	
Europe	Norway		112	17.9	NA	NA	
Europe	Sweden		110	17.3	NA	NA	
Europe	Denmark		12	16.7	NA	NA	
Europe	Ireland		222	0.5	NA	NA	
Europe	Scotland		61	6.6	NA	NA	
Europe	Britain		32	9.4	NA	NA	
Europe	Germany		32	9.4	NA	NA	
Europe	Greece		42	4.8	NA	NA	
Europe	Italy		332	2.7	NA	NA	
Asia	Russia		30	43.3	NA	NA	
Europe	Estonia		74	36.5	NA	NA	
Europe	Russia	Komi-Permyaks	42	23.8	NA	NA	
Europe	Russia	Russian (Perm)	37	43.2	NA	NA	
Europe	Russia - Mordovia	Mordovian Erzya	46	39.1	NA	NA	
Europe	Russia - Mordovia	Mordovian Moksi	46	21.7	NA	NA	
Europe	Estonia	Estonia Russian	26	26.9	NA	NA	
Europe	Ukraine	Ukrainian	6	50.0	NA	NA	
Europe	Bulgaria	Bulgarian	808	17.5	NA	NA	
Europe	Turkey	Northeast Turkish	11	18.2	NA	NA	
Europe	Turkey	Central Anatolian	18	11.1	NA	NA	
Europe	Turkey	Southwest Turkish	29	10.3	NA	NA	
Europe	Turkey	Southeast Turkish	13	15.4	NA	NA	
Europe	Cyprus	Turkish Cypriots	22	13.6	NA	NA	
Middle East		Talysh	20	10.0	NA	NA	
Caucasus	Azerbaijan	Azeri	24	12.5	NA	NA	
Europe	Croatia	Mainland	108	34.3	NA	NA	
Europe	Bosnia-Herzogivina	Bosnians	69	24.6	NA	NA	
Europe	Bosnia-Herzogivina	Herzogivinians	141	12.1	NA	NA	
Europe	Serbia	Serbians	113	15.9	NA	NA	
Europe	Kosova	Albanians	114	4.4	NA	NA	
Europe	Republic of Macedonia	Macedonians	79	15.2	NA	NA	
Europe	Republic of Macedonia	Romani	57	1.8	NA	NA	
Europe	Croatia	Mainland	109	33.9	NA	NA	
Europe	Croatia	Krk	74	28.0	NA	NA	
Europe	Croatia	Brač	49	13.0	NA	NA	
Europe	Croatia	Hvar	91	8.0	NA	NA	
Europe	Croatia	Korčula	134	27.0	NA	NA	
Europe	Russia	North	380	34.20	NA	NA	
Europe	Russia	Central	364	46.50	NA	NA	
Europe	Russia	South	484	55.40	NA	NA	
Europe	Portugal		553	1.27	NA	NA	
Europe	Sweden	Swedes	141	18.4	NA	NA	
Europe	Estonia	Estonians	209	33.5	NA	NA	
Europe	Latvia	Latvians	86	38.4	NA	NA	
Europe	Russia	Mari	111	47.7 (Rosser disagrees)	NA	NA	
Europe	Russia	Mordvin	83	26.5	NA	NA	
Europe	Russia	Komi	94	33	NA	NA	
Europe	Russia	Udmurt	87	10.3	NA	NA	
Europe	Russia	Chuvash	79	31.6	NA	NA	
Europe	Russia	Volga Tatars	126	34.1	NA	NA	
Europe	France	French	61	0	NA	NA	
Europe	Hungary	Hungarians	113	20.4	NA	NA	
Europe	Russia	Russians	61	42.6	NA	NA	
North Asia	Russia	Khant	47	4.3	NA	NA	
North Asia	Russia	Nganasan	38	0	NA	NA	
North Asia	Russia	Nenets	148	0	NA	NA	
North Asia	Russia	Selkup	131	19.1	NA	NA	
North Asia	Russia	Ket	48	0	NA	NA	
North Asia	Russia	Dolgan	67	16.4	NA	NA	
North Asia	Russia	Yakut	155	1.9	NA	NA	
North Asia	Russia	Buryat	81	1.2	NA	NA	
North Asia	Russia	Evenk	96	1	NA	NA	
North Asia	Russia	Evens	31	6.5	NA	NA	
North Asia	Russia	Altaians	98	46.9	NA	NA	
Europe	Norway	Norwegians	72	23.6	NA	NA	
Europe	Denmark	Danes	194	16.5	NA	NA	
Europe	Turkey	Kurds Zazaki speakers	27	NA	NA	25.9	
Europe	Turkey	Kurds Kurmanji speakers	87	NA	NA	12.7	
Middle East	Iraq	Kurds	95	NA	NA	11.6	
Caucasus	Georgia	Kurds	25	NA	NA	0.0	
Middle East	Jordan	Amman	101	NA	NA	2.0	
Middle East	Jordan	Dead Sea	45	NA	NA	0.0	
Middle East	Iraq	Baghdad, different ethnic groups	139	NA	NA		
Europe	Russia	Arkhangelsk	28	NA	0.00	17.9	
North Asia	Russia	Khanty	27	NA	0.00	14.8	
Europe	Russia (Komi Republic)	Izhma Komi from Izhemsky District	54	NA	0.00	29.6	
Europe	Russia (Komi Republic)	Komi from Priluzsky District	49	NA	0.00	32.7	
Europe	Russia	Kursk region Russian	40	NA	0.00	52.5	
Europe	Russia	Tver region Russian	38	NA	0.00	57.9	

R1b frequency in surveyed groups by continent and country
Continent	Population	n	Total (%)	R-P25*	R-V88	R-M269	R-M73
Africa	Northern Africa	691	5.9%	0.0%	5.2%	0.7%	0.0%
Africa	Central Sahel Region	461	23.0%	0.0%	23.0%	0.0%	0.0%
Africa	Western Africa	123	0.0%	0.0%	0.0%	0.0%	0.0%
Africa	Eastern Africa	442	0.0%	0.0%	0.0%	0.0%	0.0%
Africa	Southern Africa	105	0.0%	0.0%	0.0%	0.0%	0.0%
Europe	Western Europeans	465	57.8%	0.0%	0.0%	57.8%	0.0%
Europe	Northwestern Europeans	43	55.8%	0.0%	0.0%	55.8%	0.0%
Europe	Central Europeans	77	42.9%	0.0%	0.0%	42.9%	0.0%
Europe	Northeastern Europeans	74	1.4%	0.0%	0.0%	1.4%	0.0%
Europe	Russians	60	6.7%	0.0%	0.0%	6.7%	0.0%
Europe	Eastern Europeans	149	20.8%	0.0%	0.0%	20.8%	0.0%
Europe	Southeastern Europeans	510	13.1%	0.0%	0.2%	12.9%	0.0%
Asia	Western Asians	328	5.8%	0.0%	0.3%	5.5%	0.0%
Asia	Southern Asians	288	4.8%	0.0%	0.0%	1.7%	3.1%
Asia	Southeastern Asians	10	0.0%	0.0%	0.0%	0.0%	0.0%
Asia	Northeastern Asians	30	0.0%	0.0%	0.0%	0.0%	0.0%
Asia	Eastern Asians	156	0.6%	0.0%	0.0%	0.6%	0.0%
	Total	5326					

===== R2 =====
Haplogroup R2 is most common in South Asia and south Central Asia, as well as diaspora populations, such as the Romanis.

Frequency of R2a (R-M124) in social and linguistic subgroups of Indian populations
	Tibeto-Burman	Austro-Asiatic	Dravidian	Indo-European
Tribal	5.75%	10.94%	5.00%	-
Lower Caste	-	-	13.79%	10.00%
Middle Caste	-	-	3.53%	18.75%
Upper Caste	-	-	10.17%	16.28%

Frequency of R2a (R-M124) in the Arab world
	Count	Sample Size (n)	Frequency (%)
UAE	8	217	3.69%
Qatar	1	72	1.39%
Kuwait	1	153	0.65%
Yemen	1	104	0.96%
Jordan	2	146	1.37%
Lebanon	2	935	0.21%
Palestine	1	49	2.04%
Egypt	1	147	0.68%

R2b frequency in South Asia
Population	Frequency (%)
Burusho	10.3%
Kalash	6.8%
Pashtuns	1.0%
Gujarat	3.4%
Pakistan	0.63%

=== P2 (P-F20148) ===
==== P2a~ (P-B253) ====
The Aeta (or Agta) people of Luzon in the Philippines have also provided the only known samples of P2a (P-B253; previously known as P2).
