= Haplogroup K2b1 (Y-DNA) =

Human Y chromosome DNA grouping indicating common ancestry

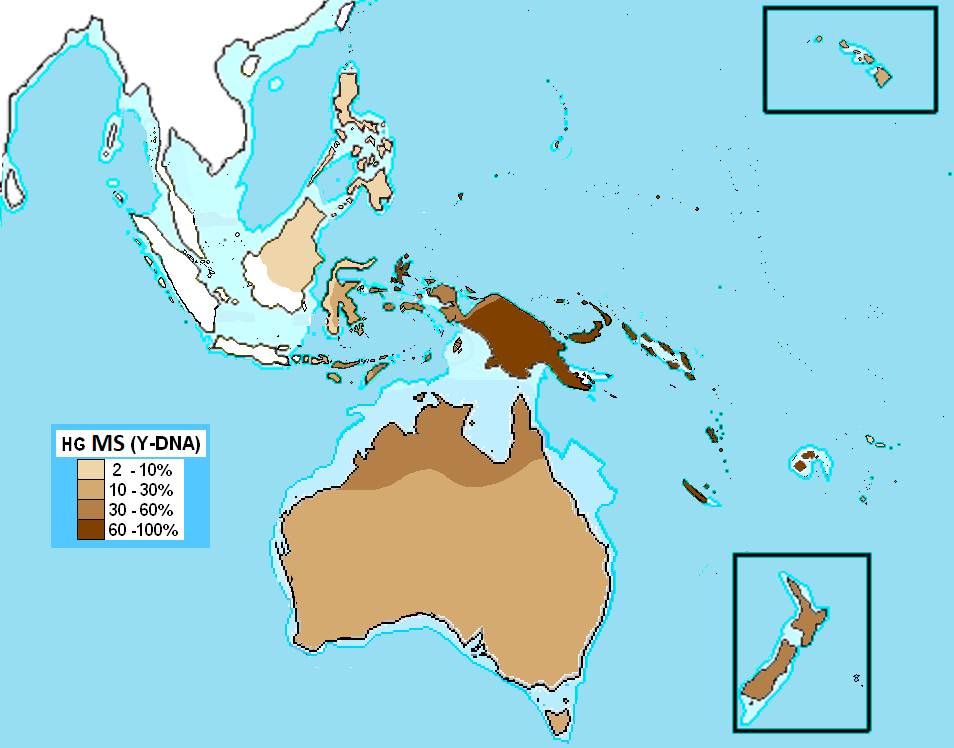
- Possible time of origin: 51,500 years BP
- Coalescence age: 50,700 years BP
- Possible place of origin: Southeast Asia; Oceania.
- Ancestor: K2b (P331)
- Descendants: S (K2b1a) and M (K2b1b)
- Defining mutations: P397, P399

Haplogroup K2b1, known sometimes as haplogroup MS, is a human Y-DNA haplogroup, defined by SNPs P397 and P399. It has a complex, diverse and not-yet fully understood internal structure; its downstream descendants include the major haplogroups Haplogroup M (P256) and Haplogroup S (M230).

It is not clear at present whether the basal haplogroup, K2b1* is carried by any living males. Individuals carrying subclades of K2b1 are found primarily among Papuan peoples, Micronesian peoples, indigenous Australians, and Polynesians.

== Structure ==
K2b1 is a direct descendant of K2b – known previously as Haplogroup MPS.

It has a number of branches including the major haplogroups S (B254), also known as K2b1a (and previously known as Haplogroup S1 or K2b1a4) and M (P256), also known as K2b1b (previously K2b1d).

- K2b1 (P397, P399), similar to the previous haplogroup MS.
  - K2b1a (P405)
    - K2b1a1 (P60)
    - K2b1a2 (P79)
    - K2b1a3 (P315)
    - Haplogroup S (B254), previously known as K2b1a.
  - Haplogroup M (P256), also known as K2b1b.

== Distribution ==
K2b1 is strongly associated with the indigenous peoples of Melanesia (especially the island of New Guinea) and Micronesia, and to a lesser extent Polynesia, where it is generally found only among 5–10% of males. It is found in 83% of males in Papua New Guinea.

Studies of indigenous Australian Y-DNA published in 2014 and 2015, suggest that, before contact with Europeans, about 29% of Australian Aboriginal or Torres Strait Islander males belonged to downstream subclades of K2b1. That is, up to 27% indigenous Australian males carry haplogroup S1a1a1 (S-P308; previously known as K2b1a1 or K-P308), and one study found that approximately 2.0% – i.e. 0.9% (11 individuals) of the sample in a study in which 45% of the total was deemed to be non-indigenous – belonged to haplogroup M1 (M-M4; also known as M-M186 and known previously as haplogroup K2b1d1). All of these males carrying M1 were Torres Strait Islanders. (The other Y-DNA haplogroups found were: basal K2* [K-M526], C1b2b [M347; previously Haplogroup C4], and basal C* [M130].)

Population	K2b1 (including Haplogroups M & S) as a %
Papua New Guinea	82.76%
New Zealand	0%
Fiji	60.75%
Solomon Islands	30%
French Polynesia	8.00%
Vanuatu	18.5%
Guam	33.3% (small sample size)
Samoa	8.04%
Kiribati	0% (small sample size)
Tonga	23% M haplogroup in one study and 26% s haplogroup in a separate study and told in that study to be up to 43% haplogroup m and haplogroup s there
Micronesia FDR	66.67%
Marshall Islands	63.64%
Palau	61.5% (small sample size)
Cook Islands	3.9%
Wallis and Futuna	26%
Tuvalu	36%
Nauru	28.6% (small sample size)
Niue	0% (small sample size)
Tokelau	50% (small sample size)
Hawaii	20% (small sample size from FTDNA)
Aboriginal Australians	20% (657 samples; 56% assumed to be non-indigenous)
Timor	6%
Aeta	0%
Chinese	0%
Filipinos	0%
Malaysia	2.40% ( small sample size )
Flores	0% ( Samples includes diverse ethnicities )
Sulawesi	11.3% ( Samples includes diverse ethnicities )
Eastern Indonesia (Wallacea)	25.9% ( Samples includes diverse ethnicities )
Java	0%
Bali	0.9%
Sumatra	0%
Borneo (Indonesia)	5.80% ( samples includes diverse ethnic minorities )
West Papua	52.6%
Papua Province	82.6%
Sumba	25.2%
Chuukkese people (Micronesia)	76.5%
Pohnpeian people (Micronesia)	70% (small sample size)
