= Haplogroup S-B254 =

Human Y-chromosome DNA haplogroup

Haplogroup S (B254)
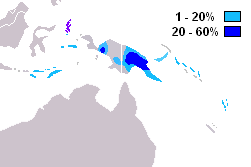
- Possible time of origin: 49,000 years BP
- Possible place of origin: Possibly Oceania
- Ancestor: K2b1
- Descendants: S1 (B255); S2 P378
- Defining mutations: B254, Z33355

Haplogroup S also known as S-B254 is a human Y-DNA haplogroup, defined by the SNPs B254 and Z33355. Until 2016, it was known as Haplogroup S1.

S-M254 is the most common haplogroup among males in the Papua New Guinea Highlands. It is also relatively common in some parts of Oceania, Wallacea and among indigenous Australians.

In a major correction to the phylogenetic tree during 2016, Haplogroup S-M230 was "demoted" from the position of basal clade S*, becoming S1a1b, while S-B254 was "promoted" in its place to the level of S*.

It has two primary subclades: S1 (B255) and S2 (P378). The existence of a third subclade, defined by the SNP, P336 has not been confirmed.

== Prevalence ==
In a study conducted among ~300 individuals who had ancestry in the Papua New Guinea Highlands, 66 of them had ancestry under S-B254.
