= Haplogroup P1 (Y-DNA) =

Human Y-chromosome DNA haplogroup

Haplogroup P1 (also known as P-M45; K2b2a)
- Possible time of origin: ~38,000 BCE
- Possible place of origin: Central Asia or Siberia
- Ancestor: P (P-P295)
- Descendants: Q (Q-M242) and R (R-M207).
- Defining mutations: M45/PF5962

Haplogroup P1, also known as P-M45 and K2b2a, is a Y-chromosome DNA haplogroup in human genetics. Defined by the SNPs M45 and PF5962, P1 is a primary branch (subclade) of P (P-P295; K2b2).

The only primary subclades of P1 are Haplogroup Q (Q-M242) and Haplogroup R (R-M207). These haplogroups now comprise most of the male lineages among Native Americans, Europeans, Central Asia and South Asia, among other parts of the world.

P1 (M45) likely originated in Central Asia or Siberia, with basal P1* (P1xQ,R) now most common among individuals in Siberia and Central Asia. A 2018 study found basal P1* in two Siberian individuals dated to the Upper Paleolithic (~31,630 cal BP) from a Yana river archaeological site known as Yana RHS.

== Structure ==
The subclades of Haplogroup P1 with their defining mutation, according to the 2016 ISOGG tree:

- P1 (M45/PF5962)
  - Q (M242)
    - Q1 (L232/S432)
  - R (M207, P224, P227, P229, P232, P280, P285, L248.2, V45)
    - R1 (M173/P241/Page29)
    - R2 (M479/PF6107)

== Ancient and modern distribution ==
=== P1* ===
The modern populations with high frequencies of P1* (or P1xQ,R) are located in Central Asia and Eastern Siberia:

- 35.4% among Tuvan males;
- 35% among Nivkh and;
- 28.3% among Altai-Kizhi.

Modern South Asian populations also feature P1 (M45) at low to moderate frequencies. In South Asia, P-M45 is most frequent among the Muslims of Manipur (Pangal, 33%), but this may be due to a very small sample size (nine individuals).

A levels of 14% P-M45* on the island of Korčula in Dalmatia (modern Croatia) and 6% on the neighbouring island of Hvar, may be linked to immigration during the early medieval period, by Central Asian peoples such as the Avars.

It is possible that many cases of haplogroup P1 reported in Central Asia, South Asia and/or West Asia are members of rare or less-researched subclades of haplogroups R2 and Q, rather than P1* per se.

Population group	Language family	Citation	Sample size	Percentage	Comments
Tuvinian	Turkic	Darenko 2005	113	35.40	P-M45
Nivkh	Nivkh	Lell 2001	17	35	P-M45
Altai-Kizhi	Turkic	Darenko 2005	92	28.3	P-M45
Todjin	Turkic	Darenko 2005	36	22.2	P-M45
Chukchi	Chukotko-Kamchatkan	Lell 2001	24	20.8	P-M45
Koryak	Chukotko-Kamchatkan	Lell 2001	27	18.5	P-M45
Yupik	Eskimo–Aleut languages	Lell 2001	33	18.2	P-M45
Uighur	Turkic	Xue 2006	70	17.1	P-M45
Kalmyk	Mongolic	Darenko 2005	68	11.8	P-M45
Turkmen	Turkic	Wells 2001	30	10	P-M45
Soyot	Turkic	Darenko 2005	34	8.8	P-M45
Uriankhai	Mongolic	Katoh 2004	60	8.3	P-M45
Khakas	Turkic	Darenko 2005	53	7.6	P-M45
Kazakh	Turkic	Wells 2001	54	5.6	P-M45
Uzbek	Turkic	Wells 2001	366	5.5	P-M45
Khasi-Khmuic	Austroasiatic	Reddy 2009	353	5.40	P-M45(xM173)^{§}
Munda	Austroasiatic	Reddy 2009	64	10.90	P-M45(xM173)^{§}
Nicobarese	Mon-Khmer	Reddy 2009	11	0.00	P-M45(xM173)^{§}
South-East Asia	Austroasiatic	Reddy 2009	257	1.60	P-M45(xM173)^{§}
Garo	Tibeto-Burman	Reddy 2009	71	1.40	P-M45(xM173)^{§}
North-east India	Tibeto-Burman	Reddy 2009	226	3.10	P-M45(xM173)^{§}
East Asia	Tibeto-Burman	Reddy 2009	214	0.00	P-M45(xM173)^{§}
Eastern India	various/unknown	Reddy 2009	54	18.50	P-M45(xM173)^{§}
Southern Talysh (Iran)	Iranian	Nasidze 2009	50	4.00	P-M45(xM124,xM173)
Northern Talysh (Azerbaijan)	Iranian	Nasidze 2009	40	5.00	P-M45(xM124,xM173)
Mazandarani	Iranian	Nasidze 2009	50	4.00	P-M45(xM124,xM173)
Gilaki	Iranian	Nasidze 2009	50	0.00	P-M45(xM124,xM173)
Tehran	Iranian	Nasidze 2004	80	4.00	P-M45(xM124,xM173)
Isfahan	Iranian	Nasidze 2004	50	6.00	P-M45(xM124,xM173)
Bakhtiari	Iranian	Nasidze 2008	53	2.00	P-M45(xM124,xM173)
Iranian Arabs	Arabic	Nasidze 2008	47	2.00	P-M45(xM124,xM173)
North Iran	Iranian	Regueiro 2006	33	9.00	P-M45(xM124,xM173)
South Iran	Iranian	Regueiro 2006	117	3.00	P-M45(xM124,xM173)
South Caucacus	Georgian	Nasidze and Stoneking 2001	77	3.00	P-M45(xM124,xM173)
South Caucacus	Armenian	Nasidze and Stoneking 2001	100	2.00	P-M45(xM124,xM173)
Sherpas from Nepal	Tibeto-Burman	Bhandari et al. 2015	582	1.67	P1(M45) or P(xQ,R1a1,R1b,R2)^{†}
Sherpas from Tibet	Tibeto-Burman	Bhandari et al. 2015	582	0.64	P1(M45) or P(xQ,R1a1,R1b,R2)^{†}
Hvar (Dalmatian Islands)	Croatian	Barać et al. 2003		14	Possible link to medieval Avar settlers.
Korčula (Dalmatian Islands)	Croatian	Barać et al. 2003		6	Possible link to medieval Avar settlers.

^{§} May include members of haplogroup R2.
^{†} May include members of haplogroup R1*/R1a*

Population group	N	P (xQ,xR)		Q		R		Paper
		Count	%	Count	%	Count	%	
Gope	16	1	6.4					Sahoo 2006
Oriya Brahmin	24	1	4.2					Sahoo 2006
Mahishya	17	3	17.6					Sahoo 2006
Bhumij	15	2	13.3					Sahoo 2006
Saora	13	3	23.1					Sahoo 2006
Nepali	7	2	28.6					Sahoo 2006
Muslims of Manipur	9	3	33.3					Sahoo 2006
Himachal Pradesh Rajput	15	1	6.7					Sahoo 2006
Lambadi	18	4	22.2					Sahoo 2006
Gujarati Patel	9	2	22.2					Sahoo 2006
Katkari	19	1	5.3					Sahoo 2006
Madia Gond	14	1	7.1					Sahoo 2006
Kamma Chowdary	15	0	0	1	6.7	12	80	Sahoo 2006

==== Q ====
Near universal in the Kets (95%) of Siberia. Very common in pre-modern Native American populations, except for the Na-Dene peoples, where it reaches 50-90%.

Also common, at 25-50%, in modern Siberian populations such as the Nivkhs, Selkups, Tuvans, Chukchi, Siberian Eskimos, Northern Altaians, and in 30% of Turkmens.

==== R ====
The only discovered case of basal R* (i.e. one that does not belong to R1 or R2) is the Mal'ta Boy.

Subclades of R1b, R1a and R2 are now dominant in various populations from Europe to South Asia.

== Sources ==
- Barać; et al. (2003). "Y chromosomal heritage of Croatian population and its island isolates" (PDF). European Journal of Human Genetics. 11 (7): 535–542. doi:10.1038/sj.ejhg.5200992. PMID 12825075. S2CID 15822710. Archived from the original (PDF) on 2012-12-17.
