= Earth Human STR Allele Frequencies Database =

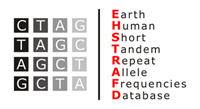
- Website type: Population Genetics Project
- Available in: English
- Headquarters: {{{location_country}}}
- Creator: Stanciu Florin
- Website: www.ehstrafd.org
- Registration: Optional
- Launched: 1 January 2009
- Current status: Inactive

The Earth Human STR Allele Frequencies Database is a scientific project based on a dynamic web interface and a relational database management system. Its main purpose is the management of STR populational data reported from all over the world, providing highly specialized population genetics tools and also an overview of world population genetic structure at global scale.

At the bottom of EHSTRAFD approach stays peer-review journals standardization trend in publishing populational data and most important, the allele frequencies gradient distribution over vast geographical areas.

== Database Tools (Modules) ==
Allele Frequency Global Tracking (AFGT) - allows searching for allele frequency distribution at global and regional level. STR Loci are available in AFGT if there are reported in at least ten EHSTRAFD populations. The AFGT locus list is permanently updated with each EHSTRAFD release.

Regional Profile Frequency (RPF) - allows calculating the frequency of a genetic profile at global and regional level, base on EHSTRAFD current records. RPF is available just for ISSOL (Interpol Standard Set Of Loci), ESS (European Standard Set - recommended by ENFSI) and CODIS (Combined DNA Index System) loci.

Most Probable Geographical Origin (MPGO) - allows searching for the most probable geographical origin of a given STR genetic profile. Geographical origin is estimated by the profile frequency in different populations. MPGO is available just for ISSOL (Interpol Standard Set Of Loci), ESS (European Standard Set - recommended by ENFSI) and CODIS (Combined DNA Index System) loci.

== See also ==
- Population Genetics
- DNA profiling
- Short Tandem Repeat
- STR analysis
- STR multiplex system
- Snpstr
- Y-STR
- List of Y-STR markers
- List of X-STR markers
- Strbase
- List of online databases
