= List of genetic genealogy topics =

This is a list of genetic genealogy topics.

== Important concepts ==
- Genetic genealogy
- Genealogical DNA test
- Human mitochondrial DNA haplogroups
- Human Y-chromosome DNA haplogroups
- Allele
- Allele frequency
- Electropherogram
- Genetic recombination
- Haplogroup
- Haplotype
- * (haplogroup)
- Most recent common ancestor
- Short tandem repeat (STR)
- Single nucleotide polymorphism (SNP)
- Y-STR (Y-chromosome short tandem repeat)

== Related fields ==
- Archaeogenetics
- Genealogy
- Genetics
  - Genetic fingerprinting
  - DNA sequencing
  - Population genetics
  - Molecular genetics

== Patrilineal relationships ==
- Patrilineality
- XY sex-determination system
- Y-chromosomal Adam
- Y-chromosomal Aaron
- Adam's Curse
- Paternal mtDNA transmission
- RecLOH

== Matrilineal relationships ==
- Matrilineality
- Mitochondrion
- Mitochondrial DNA
- Human mitochondrial genetics
- Mitochondrial Eve
- X chromosome

== Biogeography, ethnicity and migration ==
- Human migration
- Population genetics
- Multiregional hypothesis
- Single-origin hypothesis

== Projects ==
- Human Genome Project
- International HapMap Project
- Molecular Genealogy Research Project
- Surname DNA project
- The Genographic Project

== Lists ==
- List of Y-chromosome databases
- List of DNA tested mummies
- List of DNA tested historical figures
- List of genetic results derived from historical figures
- Y-chromosome haplogroups in populations of the world

== See also ==
- List of genetics-related topics
