= M167 =

M167 or M-167 may refer to:

- M167 Vulcan, a towed short-range air defense gun
- M-167 (Michigan highway), a former state highway in Michigan
- M167 (SNP), a gene variation
