= HOXA13 =

Protein-coding gene in the species Homo sapiens

Identifiers
- Aliases: HOXA13, HOX1, HOX1J, homeobox A13
- External IDs: OMIM: 142959; MGI: 96173; GeneCards: HOXA13
Available structures
PDB	Ortholog search: PDBe RCSB
PDB	List of PDB id codes 2L7Z

Gene location (Human)
Chr.	Chromosome 7 (human)
Band	7p15.2	Start	27,193,503 bp
Band	7p15.2	End	27,200,091 bp

Gene location (Mouse)
Chr.	Chromosome 6 (mouse)
Band	6 B3|6 25.41 cM	Start	52,234,674 bp
Band	6 B3|6 25.41 cM	End	52,237,788 bp
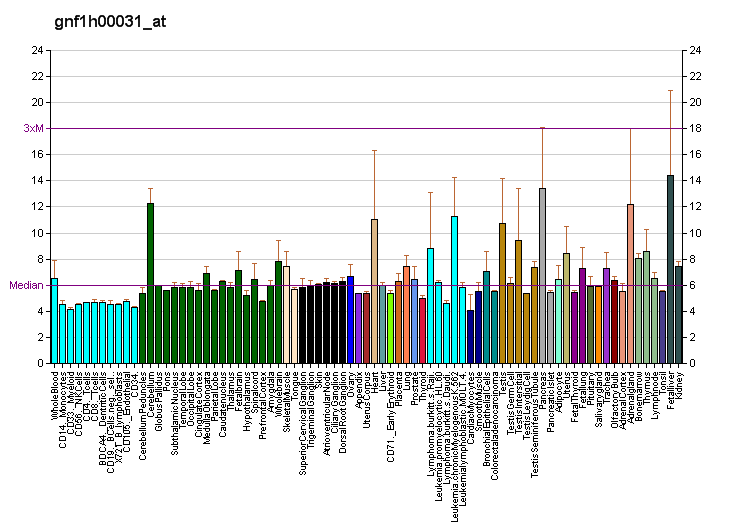
RNA expression pattern
Bgee	Human / Mouse (ortholog); Top expressed in: testicle; canal of the cervix; pancreatic ductal cell; ectocervix; prostate; seminal vesicula; rectum; vagina; buccal mucosa cell; mucosa of colon / Top expressed in: genital tubercle; autopod skin; phalanx of foot; skin of foot; phalanx of finger; skin of hand; phalanx of third toe; phalanx of fourth toe; urethra; phalanx of little toe; More reference expression data
BioGPS	More reference expression data
Gene ontology
Molecular function	DNA binding; sequence-specific DNA binding; DNA-binding transcription factor activity, RNA polymerase II-specific
Cellular component	nucleus
Biological process	multicellular organism development; skeletal system development; regulation of transcription, DNA-templated; transcription, DNA-templated; regulation of transcription by RNA polymerase II
Sources:Amigo / QuickGO
Orthologs
Databases	NCBI: entry; OMA: entry
Species	Human	Mouse
Entrez	3209	15398
Ensembl	ENSG00000106031	ENSMUSG00000038203
UniProt	P31271	Q62424
RefSeq (mRNA)	NM_000522	NM_008264
RefSeq (protein)	NP_000513	NP_032290
Location (UCSC)	Chr 7: 27.19 – 27.2 Mb	Chr 6: 52.23 – 52.24 Mb
PubMed search
- Wikidata
View/Edit Human	View/Edit Mouse

Homeobox protein Hox-A13 is a protein that in humans is encoded by the HOXA13 gene.

== Function ==
In vertebrates, the genes encoding the class of transcription factors called homeobox genes are found in clusters named A, B, C, and D on four separate chromosomes. Expression of these proteins is spatially and temporally regulated during embryonic development. This gene is part of the A cluster on chromosome 7 and encodes a DNA-binding transcription factor which may regulate gene expression, morphogenesis, and differentiation.

== Clinical significance ==
Expansion of a polyalanine tract in the encoded protein can cause hand-foot-genital syndrome, also known as hand-foot-uterus syndrome. Aberrant expression of HoxA13 gene products in the esophagus, provokes Barrett’s esophagus, a form of metaplasia that is a direct precursor to esophageal cancer.

== See also ==
- Homeobox
