= RecLOH =

Term in genetics

RecLOH is a term in genetics that is an abbreviation for "Recombinant Loss of Heterozygosity". This is a type of mutation which occurs with DNA by recombination. From a pair of equivalent ("homologous"), but slightly different (heterozygous) genes, a pair of identical genes results. In this case there is a non-reciprocal exchange of genetic code between the chromosomes, in contrast to chromosomal crossover, because genetic information is lost.

== For Y chromosome ==
In genetic genealogy, the term is used particularly concerning similar seeming events in Y chromosome DNA. This type of mutation happens within one chromosome, and does not involve a reciprocal transfer. Rather, one homologous segment "writes over" the other. The mechanism is presumed to be different from RecLOH events in autosomal chromosomes, since the target is the very same chromosome instead of the homologous one.

During the mutation one of these copies overwrites the other. Thus the differences between the two are lost. Because differences are lost, heterozygosity is lost.

Recombination on the Y-chromosome does not only take place during meiosis, but virtually at every mitosis when the Y chromosome condenses, because it doesn't require pairing between chromosomes. Recombination frequency even exceeds the frame shift mutation frequency (slipped strand mispairing) of (average fast) Y-STRs, however many recombination products may lead to infertile germ cells and "daughter out".

Recombination events (RecLOH) can be observed if YSTR databases are searched for twin alleles at 3 or more duplicated markers on the same palindrome (hairpin). E.g. DYS459, DYS464 and DYS724 (CDY) are located on the same palindrome P1. A high proportion of 9-9, 15-15-17-17, 36-36 combinations and similar twin allelic patterns will be found. PCR typing technologies have been developed (e.g. DYS464X) that are able to verify that there are most frequently really two alleles of each, so we can be sure that there is no gene deletion. Family genealogies have proven many times, that parallel changes on all markers located on the same palindrome are frequently observed and the result of those changes are always twin alleles. So a 9–10, 15-16-17-17, 36-38 haplotype can change in one recombination event to the one mentioned above, because all three markers (DYS459, DYS464 and DYS724) are affected by one and the same recLOH event.

== See also ==
- Null allele
- Paternal mtDNA transmission
- List of genetic genealogy topics
