= Haplogroup R-FGC21706 =

Haplogroup R2b, or R-FGC21706/R-FGC50231, is a Y-chromosome haplogroup characterized by genetic marker FGC21706/FGC50231. It is one of two primary descendants of Haplogroup R2 (R-M479), one being R2a (R-M124) and the other being the aforementioned R2b.

R2b and its origin are not very well known, due to the extremely low number of testers who are positive for this SNP, (29/2349 testers on FTDNA are positive for R2b out of the total R2 positive population).

Among the tested individuals, R2b has the highest presence in Pakistan (1.9%), followed by Tajikistan (0.5%), Afghanistan (0.4%), Azerbaijan (0.2%), India (0.2%), Bahrain (0.1%), Iraq (0.1%) and <0.1% in Saudi Arabia.
