= Snptstr (database) =

SNPSTR

Content
- Description: microsatellite-SNP markers.

Contact
- Laboratory: Centre for Bioinformatics, Division of Molecular Biosciences, London, UK.
- Authors: I Agrafioti
- Primary citation: Agrafioti & al. (2007)

Access
- Website: http://www.sbg.bio.ic.ac.uk/~ino/SNPSTRdatabase.html

SNPSTR is a database of Snpstrs (a microsatellite with one or more tightly linked SNPs).

== See also ==
- Snpstr
- Short tandem repeat
- Microsatellite
- Single-nucleotide polymorphism
