= Strbase =

STRBase

Content
- Description: short tandem repeat DNA database
- Organisms: Homo sapiens

Contact
- Primary citation: Ruitberg & al. (2001)

Access
- Website: http://www.cstl.nist.gov/biotech/strbase/

STRBase in computational biology is a database of Short Tandem Repeats

== See also ==
- Genetic marker
- List of biological databases
- Microsatellite instability
- Mobile element
- Satellite DNA
- Short interspersed repetitive element
- Earth Human STR Allele Frequencies Database
- UgMicroSatdb
