= Snpstr =

A SNPSTR is a compound genetic marker composed of one or more SNPs and one microsatellite (STR). Autosomal SNPSTRs, which contain an SNP and a microsatellite within 500 base pairs of one another, were discovered in 2002. More recently a database that contains all SNPSTRs in five model genomes, including human, has been created.

== Usage and importance ==
There has been widespread and growing interest in genetic markers suitable for drawing population genetic inferences about past demographic events and to detect the effects of selection. Single nucleotide polymorphisms (SNPs) and microsatellites (or short tandem repeats, STRs) have received great attention in the analysis of human population history, even though they have both disadvantages. It was thus suggested that the combination of these two markers could give rise to better conclusions.

== See also ==
- Population genetics
- Biological database
- Earth Human STR Allele Frequencies Database
- STR analysis
- STR multiplex system
- Y-STR
