= Haplogroup R-FTG47 =

- Possible time of origin: ~10,000–12,000 YBP (formation), ~6,500 YBP (TMRCA)
- Possible place of origin: South Central Asia or Iranian Plateau
- Ancestor: R-P249 (R2a1)
- Descendants: None reported
- Defining mutations: FTG47, Y583676 (YFull), others

Haplogroup R-FTG47 is a rare subclade of the Y-chromosome haplogroup R-P249 (also known as R2a1), found in the human Y-DNA phylogenetic tree. It is defined by the SNP marker FTG47 and additional private variants, and it represents a very early-diverging branch under R2a1.

== Discovery ==
R-FTG47 was first identified through the Big Y-700 test conducted by FamilyTreeDNA in 2024. It was discovered when two unrelated individuals—one from Kazakhstan and one from Egypt—were found to share a cluster of novel mutations under the previously unclassified R-P249* lineage. The clade was later added to the public haplotree and designated R-FTG47 by FTDNA.

== Phylogenetic position ==
R-FTG47 is a basal sublineage of haplogroup R2a1 (R-P249), making it a sibling branch to better-known downstream clades such as R-M124 (R2a1a) and R-L295. Phylogenetic analysis from YFull places R-FTG47 (Y583676) as one of the earliest diverging lineages within R2a1, with a Time to Most Recent Common Ancestor (TMRCA) estimated at approximately 6,500 years ago. The formation date of the haplogroup is estimated around 10,000–12,000 years before present.

== Geographic distribution ==
As of 2025, R-FTG47 has only been confirmed in two individuals:

- One from Egypt
- One from Kazakhstan, reportedly from a Khodja tribal background

The parent haplogroup R2a1 (R-P249) is most frequent in South Asia and occurs at lower frequencies in Central Asia, the Caucasus, and parts of the Middle East and Eastern Europe.

== Rarity ==
R-FTG47 is currently considered one of the rarest known living Y-DNA haplogroups. With only two confirmed members globally, and no downstream branches, it represents an exceptionally isolated and ancient lineage. The two individuals share a common ancestor who lived approximately 6,500 years ago, yet are separated by vast geographic distance and cultural histories.

Due to its:

- Extremely low number of confirmed living carriers,
- Lack of any known sub-branches,
- Ancient divergence from the main R2a1 lineage,

R-FTG47 may be the rarest known Y-DNA haplogroup with multiple confirmed members as of 2025. Other lineages may be rarer in theory but have only one known living representative or remain unclassified due to lack of testing. Until additional members are discovered or new branches confirmed, R-FTG47 stands as a unique genetic relic in the human paternal tree.

== Historical context ==
Although extremely rare, the distribution of R-FTG47 may reflect ancient migrations across Eurasia. The Egyptian and Kazakh representatives share a common ancestor estimated to have lived ~6,500 years ago. The lineage likely originated in or near South Central Asia, a known center for early R2a diversification. Historical routes such as the movements of the Scythians, Huns, Avars, and Magyars may have played a role in dispersing this lineage westward toward Eastern Europe, or southward toward the Middle East and North Africa.

Possible migration routes include:

- Indo-Iranian or early steppe migrations during the Bronze or Iron Age
- Participation in the multi-ethnic military confederations of the Eurasian steppe (e.g. Huns, Avars)
- Integration into Mamluk or Ottoman military systems, facilitating migration to Egypt

== See also ==
- Haplogroup R2 (Y-DNA)
- Genetic genealogy
- Y-DNA haplogroups in populations of the world
- Human mitochondrial DNA haplogroups
