= Haplogroup R1 =

Y-chromosome DNA haplogroup

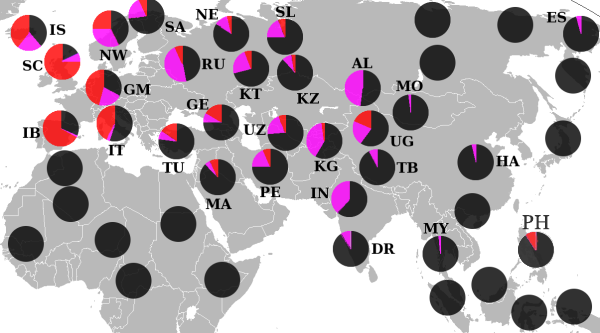
- Possible time of origin: 32,900 or 28,200 years BP
- Possible place of origin: Siberia, Central Asia, South Asia or Southwest Asia
- Ancestor: R (R-M207)
- Descendants: R1a (M420), R1b (M343)
- Defining mutations: M173/P241/Page29

Haplogroup R1, or R-M173, is a Y-chromosome DNA haplogroup. A primary subclade of Haplogroup R (R-M207), it is defined by the SNP M173. The other primary subclade of Haplogroup R is Haplogroup R2 (R-M479).

Males carrying R-M173 in modern populations appear to comprise two subclades: R1a and R1b, which are found mainly in populations native to Eurasia (except East and Southeast Asia). R-M173 contains the majority of representatives of haplogroup R in the form of its subclades, R1a and R1b (Rosser 2000, Semino 2000).

== Structure ==
Human Y-DNA Phylogenetic Tree
Haplogroup R1

- M173 (R1)
  - M420 (R1a)
    - M459 (R1a1)
      - M512
        (R1a1a)
      - (R1a1*)
    - - (R1a*)
  - M343 (R1b)
    - L278 (R1b1)
      - L754
        (R1b1a)
      - M335
        (R1b1b)
      - PH155
        (R1b1c)
    - (R1b*)

== Origins ==
R1 and its sibling clade R2 (R-M79) are the only immediate descendants of Haplogroup R (R-M207). R is a direct descendant of Haplogroup P1 (P-M45), and a sibling clade, therefore, of Haplogroup Q (Q-M242). The origins of haplogroup R1 cannot currently be proved. According to the SNP-Tracker (as of May 2023) it evolved around 25 000 BP/23 000 BC in western Siberia between the southern Urals and Lake Balkhash.

No examples of the basal subclade, R1* have yet been identified in living individuals or ancient remains. However, the parent clade, R* was present in Upper Paleolithic-era individuals (24,000 years BP), from the Mal'ta-Buret' culture, in Siberia. The autosomal DNA of the Mal'ta-Buret' people is a part of a group known to scholars of population genetics as Ancient North Eurasians (ANE). The first major descendant haplogroups appeared subsequently in hunter-gatherers from Eastern Europe (R1a, 13 kya) and Western Europe (R1b, 14 kya), with genotypes derived, to varying degrees, from ANE.

== General distribution ==
=== Eurasia ===
Haplogroup R1 is very common throughout all of Eurasia except East Asia and Southeast Asia. Its distribution is believed to be associated with the re-settlement of Eurasia following the Last Glacial Maximum. Its main subgroups are R1a and R1b. One subclade of haplogroup R1b (especially R1b1a2), is the most common haplogroup in Western Europe and Bashkortostan (Lobov 2009), while a subclade of haplogroup R1a (especially haplogroup R1a1) is the most common haplogroup in large parts of South Asia, Eastern Europe, Central Asia, Western China, and South Siberia.

Individuals whose Y-chromosomes possess all the mutations on internal nodes of the Y-DNA tree down to and including M207 (which defines Haplogroup R) but which display neither the M173 mutation that defines haplogroup R1 nor the M479 mutation that defines Haplogroup R2 are categorized as belonging to group R* (R-M207). R* has been found in 10.3% (10/97) of a sample of Burusho and 6.8% (3/44) of a sample of Kalash from northern Pakistan (Firasat 2007).

=== Americas ===
The presence of haplogroup R1 among Indigenous Americans groups is a matter of controversy. It is now the most common haplogroup after the various Q-M242, especially in North America in Ojibwe people at 79%, Chipewyan 62%, Seminole 50%, Cherokee 47%, Dogrib 40% and Tohono O'odham 38%.

Some authorities point to the greater similarity between haplogroup R1 subclades found in North America and those found in Siberia (e.g. Lell and Raghavan), suggesting prehistoric immigration from Asia and/or Beringia.

=== Africa ===
One subclade, now known as R1b1a2 (R-V88), is found only at high frequencies amongst populations native to West Africa, such as the Fulani, and is believed to reflect a prehistoric back-migration from Eurasia to Africa.

== Subclade distribution ==
=== R1a (R-M420) ===
The split of R1a (M420) is computed to ca 25,000 years ago (95% CI: 21, 300–29, 000 BP), or roughly the Last Glacial Maximum. A large study performed in 2014 (Underhill et al. 2015), using 16,244 individuals from over 126 populations from across Eurasia, concluded that there was compelling evidence that "the initial episodes of haplogroup R1a diversification likely occurred in the vicinity of present-day Iran." The subclade M417 (R1a1a1) diversified ca. 5,800 years ago. The distribution of M417-subclades R1-Z282 (including R1-Z280) in Central- and Eastern Europe and R1-Z93 in Asia suggests that R1a1a diversified within the Eurasian Steppes or the Middle East and Caucasus region. The place of origin of these subclades plays a role in the debate about the origins of the Indo-Europeans. High frequencies of haplogroup R1a are found amongst West Bengal Brahmins (72%), and Uttar Pradesh Brahmins, (67%), the Ishkashimi (68%), the Tajik population of Panjikent (64%), the Kyrgyz population of Central Kyrgyzstan (63.5%), Sorbs (63.39%), Bihar Brahmins (60.53%), Shors (58.8%), Poles (56.4%), Teleuts (55.3%), South Altaians (58.1%), Ukrainians (50%) and Russians (50%) (Semino 2000, Wells 2001, Behar 2003, and Sharma 2007).

=== R1b (R-M343) ===
Haplogroup R1b probably originated in Eurasia prior to or during the last glaciation. It is the most common haplogroup in Western Europe and Bashkortostan (Lobov 2009). It may have survived the last glacial maximum, in refugia near the southern Ural Mountains and Aegean Sea.(Lobov 2009).

It is also present at lower frequencies throughout Eastern Europe, with higher diversity than in western Europe, suggesting an ancient migration of haplogroup R1b from the east. Haplogroup R1b is also found at various frequencies in many different populations near the Ural Mountains and Central Asia, its likely region of origin.

There may be a correlation between this haplogroup and the spread of Centum branch Indo-European languages in southern and western Europe. For instance, the modern incidence of R1b reaches between 60% and 90% of the male population in most parts of Spain, Portugal, France, Britain and Ireland. The clade is also found at frequencies of up to 90% in the Chad Basin, and is also present in North Africa, where its frequency surpasses 10% in some parts of Algeria.

Although it is rare in South Asia, some populations show relatively high percentages for R1b. These include Lambadi showing 37% (Kivisild 2003). Hazara 32% (Sengupta 2005), and Agharia (in East India) at 30% (Sengupta 2005). Besides these, R1b has appeared in Balochi (8%), Bengalis (6.5%), Chenchu (2%), Makrani (5%), Newars (10.6%), Pallan (3.5%) and Punjabis (7.6%) (Kivisild 2003, Sengupta 2005, and Gayden 2007). In Southeast Asia, it is present in the Philippines due to Spanish and American colonization where different studies vary as to its frequency; from 3.6% of the male population, in a year 2001 study conducted by Stanford University Asia-Pacific Research Center had European Y-DNA R1b to 13% in a Public Y-DNA Library.

R-M343 (previously called Hg1 and Eu18) is the most frequent Y-chromosome haplogroup in Europe. It is an offshoot of R-M173, characterised by the M343 marker. An overwhelming majority of members of R-M343 are classified as R-P25 (defined by the P25 marker), the remainder as R-M343*. Its frequency is highest in Western Europe (and due to modern European immigration, in parts of the Americas). The majority of R-M343-carriers of European descent belong to the R-M269 (R1b1a2) descendant line.

== See also ==
- History of Eurasia

=== Genetics ===
- Genetic history of the Middle East
- Conversion table for Y chromosome haplogroups
- Genetic Genealogy
- Haplogroup
- Haplotype
- Human Y-chromosome DNA haplogroup
- Molecular Phylogeny
- Paragroup
- Subclade
- Y-chromosomal Aaron
- Y-chromosome haplogroups in populations of the world
- Y-DNA haplogroups by ethnic group
- Y-DNA haplogroups in populations of South Asia
- Y-DNA haplogroups in populations of East and Southeast Asia
- Y-DNA haplogroups in populations of the Near East
- Y-DNA haplogroups in populations of North Africa
- Y-DNA haplogroups in populations of the Caucasus

=== Y-DNA R-M207 subclades ===
- R-L295
- R-M124
- R-M167
- R-M17
- R (R-M207)
- R-M420
- R-M479
