= Haplogroup R-M167 =

Y-chromosome haplogroup

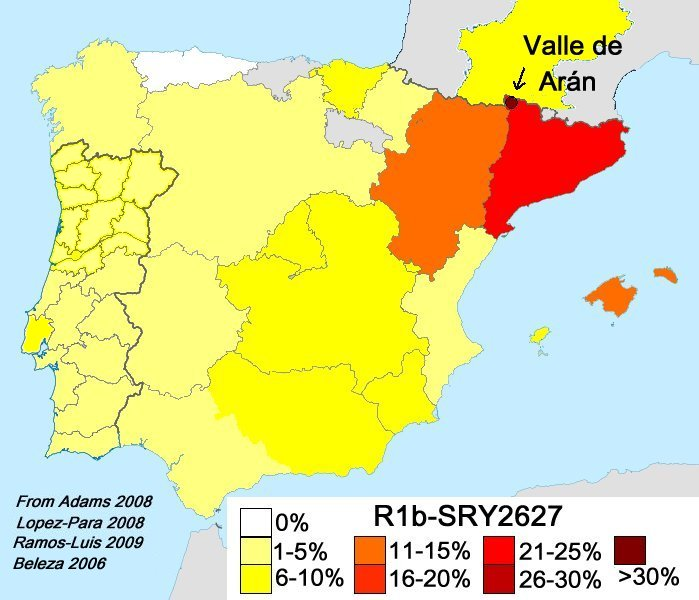
- Possible time of origin: 1,650 to 3,450 or 1,000 to 2,650 years BP
- Possible place of origin: Pyrenees
- Ancestor: R-M269, P312, DF27, S228, Z262
- Defining mutations: M167/SRY2627
- Highest frequencies: Catalans

In human genetics, Haplogroup R-M167 (R1b1a1a2a1a2a1b1a1) is a Y-chromosome haplogroup which is a subdivision of Haplogroup R-DF27 and the wider haplogroup R-M269 (more specifically, its subclade R-) defined by the presence of the marker M167 (also known as SRY2627).

It arose comparatively recently, after the beginning of the European Bronze Age, and is mostly prevalent in the population of the Pyrenees region.

== Distribution ==
The first author to test for this marker (long before current haplogroup nomenclature existed) was Hurles in 1999, who tested 1158 men in various populations. He found it relatively common among Basques (13/117: 11%) and Catalans (7/32: 22%). Other occurrences were found among other Spanish, Béarnais, other French, British and Germans.

In 2000 Rosser et al., in a study which tested 3616 men in various populations also tested for that same marker, naming the haplogroup Hg22, and again it was found mainly among Basques (19%), in lower frequencies among French (5%), Bavarians (3%), Spanish (2%), Southern Portuguese (2%), and in single occurrences among Romanians, Slovenians, Dutch, Belgians and English.

In 2001 Bosch described this marker as H103, found in 5 Basques and 5 Catalans. However a study in 2005 of Spanish Basques found lower levels of this haplogroup than those recorded in Basques by the earlier studies - only four samples out of the 168 tested.

In 2008 a study by Adams and colleagues covered the whole of the Iberian Peninsula. It found the highest levels of this haplogroup in Catalonia. In the same year a study by López-Parra and colleagues concentrated on the populations of the Spanish Pyrenees. They discovered a high levels of this haplogroup in the central and eastern Pyrenees. The highest level so far discovered (48%) was found in the Val d'Aran, Catalonia.

In a larger study specifically of Portugal in 2006, with 663 men tested, Beleza et al. showed low levels of this haplogroup ( described in the paper as R1b3f) in all the major regions, from 1.5%-3.5%. Breaking the results down to district, only Lisboa (at 5.7%) had over 5%.

A 2012 study by Martinez-Cruz et al. found the following percentages of SRY2627: 7% in the three French departments of the Pays de Basque, 16% in Bearn, 14% in Bigorre, 7% in Chalosse, 6% in the Basque regions of Spain, 15% in La Rioja, and 19% in northern Aragon.

According to an "analysis of the R1b-DF27 haplogroup" published in August 2017, SRY2627 (M167) appeared 3,458 years before present in Spain (Aragon).

== Haplotypes ==
=== Modal ===
- R1b1b2a1a2c (R1b1a2a1a1b5a) Modal Haplotype. Ysearch 77ADS

DYS	393	390	19	391	385A	385B	426	388	439	389I	392	389II	458	459A	459B	455	454	447	437	448	449	464A	464B	464C	464D
Alleles	13	24	14	11	11	14	12	12	12	13	13	29	17	9	10	11	11	25	15	19	29	15	15	17	18

== See also ==
=== Y-DNA R-M207 subclades ===
- R-L21
- R-L295
- R-M124
- R-M167
- R-M17
- R-M173
- R-M207
- R-M342
- R-M420
- R-M479
- R-U106
