= Haplogroup R-L295 =

Human Y-chromosome DNA haplogroup

- Possible time of origin: 8,800 [95% CI 8,100 <-> 9,600] ybp
- Coalescence age: 7,900 [95% CI 7,000 <-> 8,800] ybp
- Possible place of origin: n/a
- Ancestor: R2a
- Descendants: R-L295*, R-L294
- Defining mutations: L295
- Highest frequencies: n/a

Haplogroup R-L295 also known as R2a1 is a Y-chromosome haplogroup characterized by genetic marker L295, which has been found in South Asia, Anatolia, Arabian Peninsula, Europe and Central Asia.

== Subclades ==
- Haplogroup R‑L295
  - Paragroup R-L295*
  - Haplogroup R-L294

=== Paragroup R-L295* ===
Paragroup is a term used in population genetics to describe lineages within a haplogroup that are not defined by any additional unique markers. They are typically represented by an asterisk (*) placed after the main haplogroup.

Y-chromosomes which are positive to the L295 SNP and negative to the L294 SNP, are categorized as belonging to Paragroup R-L295*. It is found in South Asia, Anatolia, the Arabian Peninsula, Europe, & Central Asia so far.

=== Haplogroup R-L294 ===
Haplogroup R-L294 is represented by the L294 SNP and found in Armenia and Turkey so far.

== See also ==
=== Y-DNA R-M207 subclades ===
- R-L21
- R-L295
- R-M124
- R-M167
- R-M17
- R-M173
- R-M207
- R-M342
- R-M420
- R-M479
- R-U106
