= List of Y-DNA single-nucleotide polymorphisms =

| Mutation number | Nucleotide change | Position (base pair) | Total size (base pairs) | Position Forward 5′→3′ | Reverse 5′→3′ |
|---|---|---|---|---|---|
| M1 (YAP) | 291bp insertion | | | | |
| M2 | A to G | 168 | 209 | aggcactggtcagaatgaag | aatggaaaatacagctcccc |
| M3 | | | | | |
| M4 | | | | | |
| M8 | | | | | |
| M9 | | | | | |
| M15 | | | | | |
| M17 | | | | | |
| M20 | | | | | |
| M33 | | | | | |
| M35 | | | | | |
| M38 | | | | | |
| M40 | | | | | |
| M42 | | | | | |
| M45 | | | | | |
| M52 | | | | | |
| M55 | | | | | |
| M57 | | | | | |
| M60 | | | | | |
| M64.1 | | | | | |
| M75 | | | | | |
| M89 | | | | | |
| M91 | | | | | |
| M94 | | | | | |
| M95 | | | | | |
| M96 | | | | | |
| M105 | | | | | |
| M122 | | | | | |
| M124 | | | | | |
| M130 | | | | | |
| M131 | | | | | |
| M132 | | | | | |
| M139 | | | | | |
| M145 | | | | | |
| M168 | | | | | |
| M170 | | | | | |
| M172 | | | | | |
| M173 | | | | | |
| M174 | | | | | |
| M175 | | | | | |
| M176 | | | | | |
| M179 | | | | | |
| M201 | | | | | |
| M203 | | | | | |
| M207 | | | | | |
| M213 | | | | | |
| M214 | | | | | |
| M216 | | | | | |
| M217 | | | | | |
| M231 | G to A | 110 | 331 | cctattatcctggaaaatgtgg | attccgattcctagtcacttgg |
| M241 | G to A | 54 | 366 | aactcttgataaaccgtgctg | tccaatctcaattcatgcctc |
| M242 | C to T | 180 | 366 | aactcttgataaaccgtgctg | tccaatctcaattcatgcctc |
| M253 | C to T | 283 | 400 | gcaacaatgagggtttttttg | cagctccacctctatgcagttt |
| M258 | | | | | |
| M267 | T to G | 148 | 287 | ttatcctgagccgttgtccctg | tgtagagacacggttgtaccct |
| M268 | | | | | |
| M269 | | | | | |
| M285 | G to C | 70 | 287 | ttatcctgagccgttgtccctg | tgtagagacacggttgtaccct |
| M286 | G to A | 129 | 287 | ttatcctgagccgttgtccctg | tgtagagacacggttgtaccct |
| M287 | A to T | 100 | 287 | ttatcctgagccgttgtccctg | tgtagagacacggttgtaccct |
| M297 | | | | | |
| M299 | | | | | |
| M304 | A to C | 421 | 527 | caaagtgctgggattacagg | cttctagcttcatctgcattgt |
| M306 | | | | | |
| M335 | T to A | 162 | 417 | aagaaatgttgaactgaaagttgat | aggtgtatctggcatccgtta |
| M339 | T to G | 285 | 517 | aggcaggacaactgagagca | tgcttgatcctgggaagt |
| M340 | G to C | 218 | 386 | ccagtcagcagtacaaaagttg | gcatttctttgattatagaagcaa |
| M342 | C to T | 52 | 173 | agagagttttctaacagggcg | tgggaatcacttttgcaact |
| M343 | C to A | 402 | 424 | tttaacctcctccagctctgca | acccccacatatctccagg |
| M347 | | | | | |
| M349 | G to T | 209 | 493 | tgggattaaaggtgctcatg | caaaattggtaagccattagct |
| M356 | | | | | |
| M359 | T to C | 122 | 447 | cgtctatggccttgaaga | tccgaaaatgcagacttt |
| M365 | A to G | 246 | 274 | ccttcatttaggctgtagctgc | tgtatctttagttgagatgg |
| M367 | A to G | 196 | 274 | ccttcatttaggctgtagctgc | tgtatctttagttgagatgg |
| M368 | A to C | 200 | 274 | ccttcatttaggctgtagctgc | tgtatctttagttgagatgg |
| M369 | G to C | 45 | 274 | ccttcatttaggctgtagctgc | tgtatctttagttgagatgg |
| M370 | C to G | 166 | 274 | ccttcatttaggctgtagctgc | tgtatctttagttgagatgg |
| M405 | | | | | |

== See also ==
- Single-nucleotide polymorphism
- Unique-event polymorphism
- Human Y-chromosome DNA haplogroups
- List of Y-STR markers
