= Y-STR =

Repetitive DNA sequence

STR rate ranges as of 2008 for 16 Y-STRs
STR site	Mutation rate (× 10^{−3})
STR site	LB-96%CI	'rate'	UB-96%CI	Notes
DYS19	1.5	2.4	3.5	23 of 9658
DYS385	1.4	2.1	3.0	31 of 14896
DYS389I	0.95	1.8	3.0	14 of 7862
DYS389II	1.8	2.8	4.2	22 of 7849
DYS390	1.4	2.3	3.5	21 of 9140
DYS391	2.0	3.0	4.5	28 of 9089
DYS392	0.18	0.55	1.3	5 of 9053
DYS393	0.36	0.89	1.8	7 of 7842
DYS437	0.60	1.5	3.1	7 of 4672
DYS438	0.051	0.43	1.5	2 of 4709
DYS439	3.8	5.7	8.4	27 of 4686
DYS448	0.19	1.6	5.7	2 of 1258
DYS456	1.8	4.8	10	6 of 1258
DYS458	2.8	6.4	12	8 of 1258
DYS635	1.6	3.8	7.4	8 of 2131
GATA H4.1	0.71	2.2	5.1	5 of 2294
From table 1. Sanchez-Diz et al. 2008. Note some of the N in the 17 STR are quite low in frequency

A Y-STR is a short tandem repeat (STR) on the Y-chromosome. Y-STRs are often used in forensics, paternity, and genealogical DNA testing. Y-STRs are taken specifically from the male Y chromosome. These Y-STRs provide a weaker analysis than autosomal STRs because the Y chromosome is found only in males, which are passed down only by the father, making the Y chromosome in any paternal line practically identical. This causes a significantly smaller amount of distinction between Y-STR samples. Autosomal STRs provide a much stronger analytical power because of the random matching that occurs between pairs of chromosomes during the zygote-making process.

== Nomenclature ==
Y-STRs are assigned names by the HUGO gene nomenclature committee (HGNC).

Some testing companies have different formats for the way STR markers are written. For example, the marker DYS455 may be written as DYS455, DYS 455, DYS#455, or DYS# 455. The scientific standard accepted by HUGO and NIST is DYS455.

=== DYS ===
DYS is a variation on the jargon used in human autosomal STR testing where the second character is typically reserved for the chromosome number (e.g. D8S1179).

D = DNA
Y = Y-chromosome
S = (unique) segment

== Y-STR analysis ==
There are regions on DNA that are made up of multiple copies of short repeating sequences of bases (for example TATT) which repeat a variable number of times depending on the individual. These regions, called "variable number short tandem repeats", are what is looked at when performing STR analysis. The likelihood of two people having the same number of repeated sequences is extremely small, and becomes even smaller the more regions that are analyzed. This makes up the basis of short tandem repeat analysis. The cornerstone for this process, however, is polymerase chain reaction (PCR). This allows forensic scientists to make millions of copies of the STR regions. Gel electrophoresis then "yields the number of times each repeat unit appears in the fragment." This allows for easy comparison of DNA.

Y-STR analysis is not a robust method of identity determination due to the possibility of haplotype convergence, whereby two or more men acquire the same Y-STR repeat numbers purely by chance rather than by common descent. Some lineages in the R1b Y haplogroup (the most common in Europe) are a prominent example of this.

== STRs and forensics ==
In the United States, 13 different autosomal STR loci are used as a basis of analysis for forensic purposes. If crime scene DNA is ample and all 13 autosomal loci accessible, the likelihood of two unrelated people matching the same sample is around one in one billion.

The basis for the profile probability estimation for Y-STR analysis is the counting method. The application of a confidence interval accounts for database size and sampling variation. The Y haplotype frequency (p) is calculated using the p = x/N formula, where x is equal to the number of times the haplotype is observed in a database containing N number of haplotypes. For example, if a haplotype has been observed twice in a database of N = 2000, the frequency of that haplotype will be: 2/2000 = 0.001. Reporting a Y haplotype frequency, without a confidence interval, is acceptable but provides a factual statement regarding observations of only a Y haplotype in the database. An upper confidence limit for the probability of the Y haplotype in the population should be calculated using the method described by Clopper and Pearson (1934). This uses the binomial distribution for the probabilities of counts, including zero or other small numbers that are found for Y haplotypes.

== Databases ==
Forensic databases (without individual information, for frequency purposes):

- US Y-STR Database
- Y Chromosome Haplotype Reference Database

In genetic genealogy, Ysearch used to be the last sponsored database containing publicly submitted surnames and Y-STR haplotypes until its decommission on May 24, 2018, preceding by a day the implementation of the General Data Protection Regulation in the European Union, following a prolonged period of lacking support from its creator, Family Tree DNA. The database was founded in 2003 and reached 219 thousand records (among which 152 thousand unique haplotypes) before its shutdown. Other similar databases had disappeared earlier.

Haplogroup (Y-SNP) specific data:

- Haplozone: The E-M35 Phylogeny Project (former E3b Project)

== See also ==
- Genealogical DNA test
- List of Y-STR markers
- List of X-STR markers
- Tandem repeat
- STR analysis
- STR multiplex system
- Earth Human STR Allele Frequencies Database
- Snpstr
