= Microsatellite enrichment =

Molecular biology technique

Microsatellite enrichment is a method in molecular biology used for enriching the amount of microsatellite sequences in a DNA sample. This can be achieved by designing oligonucleotide probes that hybridize with the repeats in the microsatellites and then pull out the probe/microsatellite complexes from the solution. This has been shown to be a cost-effective method to sample the genetic diversity in non-model organisms.
