= Null allele =

Nonfunctional allele caused by a genetic mutation

A null allele is a nonfunctional allele (a variant of a gene) caused by a genetic mutation. Such mutations can cause a complete lack of production of the associated gene product or a product that does not function properly; in either case, the allele may be considered nonfunctional. The presence of a null allele cannot be distinguished from deletion of the entire locus solely from phenotypic observation.

A mutant allele that produces no RNA transcript is called an RNA null (shown by Northern blotting or by DNA sequencing of a deletion allele), and one that produces no protein is called a protein null (shown by Western blotting). A genetic null or amorphic allele has the same phenotype when homozygous as when heterozygous with a deficiency that disrupts the locus in question. A genetic null allele may be both a protein null and an RNA null, but may also express normal levels of a gene product that is nonfunctional by mutation.

Null alleles can have lethal effects depending on the importance of the mutated gene. For example, mice homozygous for a null allele for insulin die 48 to 72 hours after birth. Null alleles can also have beneficial effects, such as the elevated harvest index of semi-dwarf rice of the green revolution caused by null alleles in GA20ox-2.

== Evidence ==
=== Polymerase chain reaction (PCR) ===
A microsatellite null allele is an allele at a microsatellite locus that does not amplify to detectable levels in a polymerase chain reaction test. Microsatellite regions are usually characterized by short, repeated sequences of nucleotides. Primers that are specific to a particular locus are used in PCR amplification to bind to these nucleotide sequence repeats and are used as genetic markers. The primers anneal to either end of the locus and are derived from source organisms in a genomic library. Divergence from the reference sequences (from genetic mutations) results in poor annealing of the primers so that the marker cannot be used, representative of a null allele.

=== Parentage analysis ===
Strong evidence of null alleles was first seen in analysis of bears in 1995. In this analysis, a known parent was determined to be homozygous at a certain locus, but produced offspring that expressed a different "homozygous" genotype. This result led to the inference that the parent and offspring were both heterozygous for the locus being studied.

== Examples ==
Null alleles or genes have been studied in different organisms from the red pines of Minnesota to Drosophila melanogaster and mice. Null alleles are difficult to identify because a heterozygous individual for one null allele and one active allele is phenotypically indistinguishable from a homozygous individual with both active alleles. In other words, a null allele can only be identified from the phenotypic standpoint if the individual is homozygous for the null allele. Researchers have been able to work around this problem by using detailed Electrophoresis, gel assays, and chromosomal manipulation.

1. Allendorf et al. studied the enzyme activity of the same species of red pine seeds collected from two different tree stands in Minnesota. The two groups of trees were treated as one population because no deviations from expected genotype frequencies were observed, as would be expected if the populations were diverging from one another. Many different loci were tested for enzyme activity using a specific gel electrophoresis technique. Alleles that produced an enzyme lacking catalytic activity were denoted as null alleles. A total of 27 loci were tested in red pines and null alleles were found at 3 of those loci.
2. A population of Drosophila melanogaster from Raleigh, NC were genetically manipulated by Voelker et al. in 1980 to determine existence and frequency of null alleles. The experiment consisted of making the chromosome of a wild fly heterozygous by using the mobility variants at the locus being observed. If the manipulated allele (now heterozygous) did not present a heterozygous phenotype, the allele was suspected to be null. These potential null alleles were then confirmed when they failed to produce a heterozygous electrophoretic pattern. A total of 25 loci were tested with 5 loci being X-linked and the remaining 20 autosomal. No null alleles were detected at the X-linked loci, but 13 of the 20 autosomal loci contained null alleles.
3. Multiple different experiments have used genetic manipulation to induce null allele mutants in mice populations in order to observe the consequences of different allele combinations at specific loci. Two such experiments investigated the role of insulin-like growth factor (Igf) in mouse embryonic development. The experiments only differed in the gene being investigated, Igf-1 and Igf-2. Both experiments used the process of mutageneis, whereby the genetic content of the organism is changed, to produce individuals with different combinations of null mutations. By observing the consequences of different inactive allele combinations, the researchers were able to deduce the roles of insulin-like growth factors in the development of mice. The experiment involving Igf-1 revealed that, in addition to its role after birth, it is also fundamental in the development of the embryo and the differentiation of cells.
4. One example of a null allele is the 'O' blood type allele in the human A, B and O blood type system. The alleles for the A-antigen and B-antigen are co-dominant, thus they are both phenotypically expressed if both are present. The allele for O blood type, however, is a mutated version of the allele for the A-antigen, with a single base pair change due to genetic mutation. The protein coded for by the O allele is enzymatically inactive and therefore the O allele is expressed phenotypically in homozygous OO individuals as the lack of any blood antigen. Thus we may consider the allele for the O blood type as a null allele.

== See also ==
- Pseudogene
- Muller's morphs
- Genetic deletion
- RecLOH
- Unique-event polymorphism
