= Haplogroup R-M124 =

Human Y-chromosome DNA haplogroup

Haplogroup R2a
- Possible time of origin: 14,700 [95% CI 13,200 <-> 16,100] years before present
- Coalescence age: 11,900 [95% CI 10,500 <-> 13,400] years before present
- Possible place of origin: Southwest Asia
- Ancestor: R-M479
- Descendants: R-M124*, R-L295, R-L263, R-L1069
- Defining mutations: M124, P249, P267, L266

Haplogroup R2a, or haplogroup R-M124, is a Y-chromosome haplogroup characterized by genetic markers M124, P249, P267, L266, and is mainly found in South Asia as well as in Central Asia, Caucasus, Middle East and North Africa.

== Term history ==
Haplogroup R2a is also known as haplogroup R-M124. The first reference to the newly defined haplogroup, "R-M124", was on 25 August 2010.

Before the publication of the 2005 Y-Chromosome Phylogenetic Tree, Haplogroup R-M124 was known as Haplogroup P1 and formerly thought to be a sister clade of Haplogroup R rather than derived from it.

Haplogroup R2 most often observed in Asia, especially on the Indian subcontinent and Central Asia. It is also reported at notable frequencies in the Caucasus.

== Origins ==
According to Sengupta et al. (2006),

uncertainty neutralizes previous conclusions that the intrusion of HGs R1a1 and R2 [Now R-M124] from the northwest in Dravidian-speaking southern tribes is attributable to a single recent event. Rather, these HGs contain considerable demographic complexity, as implied by their high haplotype diversity. Specifically, they could have actually arrived in southern India from a southwestern Asian source region multiple times, with some episodes considerably earlier than others.

== Subclades ==
- Haplogroup R‑M124
  - Paragroup R-M124*
  - Haplogroup R-L295
  - Haplogroup R-L263
  - Haplogroup R-L1069

=== Paragroup R-M124* ===
Paragroup is a term used in population genetics to describe lineages within a haplogroup that are not defined by any additional unique markers. They are typically represented by an asterisk (*) placed after the main haplogroup.

Y-chromosomes which are positive to the M124, P249, P267, and L266 SNPs and negative to the L295, L263, and L1069 SNPs, are categorized as belonging to Paragroup R-M124*. It is found in Iraq, so far.

=== Haplogroup R-L295 ===
Haplogroup R-L295 is a Y-chromosome haplogroup characterized by genetic marker L295. It is found in South Asia, Anatolia, Arabian Peninsula, Europe, & Central Asia so far.

=== Haplogroup R-L263 ===
Haplogroup R-L263 is a Y-chromosome haplogroup characterized by genetic marker L263. It is found in Greek Asia Minor & Armenia so far.

=== Haplogroup R-L1069 ===
Haplogroup R-L1069 is a Y-chromosome haplogroup characterized by genetic marker L1069. It is found in Kuwait so far.

== Distribution ==
R-M124 is most often observed in Asia, especially on the Indian subcontinent and in Central Asia It is also reported at notable frequencies in Caucasus.

=== Historical ===
Ancient samples of haplogroup R2a were observed in the remains of humans from Neolithic, Chalcolithic and Bronze Age Iran and Turan; and Iron Age South Asia. R2a was also recovered from excavated remains in the South Asian sites of Saidu Sharif and Butkara from a later period.

=== South Asia ===
Frequency of R-M124 in Social and Linguistic Subgroups of Indian Populations (Source: Sengupta et al. 2006)
	Tibeto-Burman	Austro-Asiatic	Dravidian	Indo-European
Tribe	5.75%	10.94%	5.00%	-
Lower Caste	-	-	13.79%	10.00%
Middle Caste	-	-	3.53%	18.75%
Upper Caste	-	-	10.17%	16.28%

Haplogroup R-M124, along with haplogroups H, L, R1a1, and J2, forms the majority of the South Asian male population. The frequency is around 10-15% in India and Sri Lanka and 7-8% in Pakistan. Its spread within South Asia is very extensive, ranging from Balochistan in the west to Bengal in the east; Hunza in the north to Sri Lanka in the south.

==== India ====
Among regional groups, it is found among West Bengalis (23%), New Delhi Hindus (20%), Punjabis (5%) and Gujaratis (3%). Among tribal groups, Karmalis of West Bengal showed highest at 100% (16/16) followed by Lodhas (43%) to the east, while Bhil of Gujarat in the west were at 18%, Tharus of north showed it at 17%, Chenchu and Pallan of south were at 20% and 14% respectively. Among caste groups, high percentages are shown by Jaunpur Kshatriyas (87%), Kamma Chaudhary (73%), Bihar Yadav (50%), Khandayat (46%), and Kallar (44%).

It is also significantly high in many Brahmin groups including Bhargavas (32%), Chaturvedis (32%), Lingayat Brahmins (30%), Punjabi Brahmins (25%), Bengali Brahmins (22%), Konkanastha Brahmins (20%), Tamil Brahmins (17%) and Kashmiri Pandits (14%).

North Indian Muslims have a frequency of 19% (Sunni) and 13% (Shia), while Dawoodi Bohra Muslim in the western state of Gujarat have a frequency of 16% and Mappila Muslims of South India have a frequency of 5%.

==== Pakistan ====
The R2 haplogroup in the northern regions of Pakistan is found among Kalash people (33%), Burusho people (14%), Pashtuns (10%) and Hazaras (4%).

In southern regions, it is found among Balochis (12%), Brahuis (12%) and Sindhis (5%).

==== Afghanistan ====
The R2-M124 haplogroup occurs at a considerably higher rate in the northern regions of Afghanistan (11.4%). Although the true percentage remains debated, the haplogroup is known to be at elevated levels in the Pamiri population (number ranges from 6-17% depending on the group). One study on Nuristanis shows a 20% frequency of R2 (1/5), albeit with a small sample size.

==== Sri Lanka ====
38% of the Sinhalese of Sri Lanka were found to be R2 positive according to a 2003 research.

=== Central Asia ===
In Kazakh tribes it varies from 1% to 12%, however it is found at a higher percent at about 25% among Tore Tribe / Genghis Khans descendant tribe.

In Central Asia, Tajikistan shows Haplogroup R-M124 at 6%, while the other '-stan' states vary around 2%. Bartangis of Tajikistan have a high frequency of R-M124 at about 17%, Ishkashimi at 8%, Khojant at 9% and Dushanbe at 6%.

Specifically, Haplogroup R-M124 has been found in approximately 7.5% (4/53) of recent Iranian emigrants living in Samarkand, 7.1% (7/99) of Pamiris, 6.8% (3/44) of Karakalpaks, 5.1% (4/78) of Tajiks, 5% (2/40) of Dungans in Kyrgyzstan, 3.3% (1/30) of Turkmens, 2.2% (8/366) of Uzbeks, and 1.9% (1/54) of Kazakhs.

=== West Asia and North Africa ===
The haplogroup R-M124 frequency of 6.1% (6/114) was found among overall Kurds while in one study which was done with 25 samples of Kurmanji Kurds from Georgia, R-M124 has been observed at 44% (11/25)

In Caucasus high frequency was observed in Armenians from Sason at 17% (18/104) while it was observed at %1 in Armenians from Van. R2 has been found in Chechens at 16%. R-M124 has been found in approximately 8% (2/24) of a sample of Ossetians from Alagir.

In the Caucasus, around 16% of Mountain Jews, 8% of Balkars, 6% of Kalmyks, 3% of Azerbaijanis, 2.6% of Kumyks, 2.4% of Avars, 2% of Armenians, and 1% to 6% of Georgians belong to the R-M124 haplogroup. Approximately 1% of Turks and 1% to 3% of Iranians also belong to this haplogroup.

In Iran R-M124 follows a similar distribution as R1a1 with higher percentages in the southeastern Iran. It has been found at Frequencies of 9.1% at Isfahan, 6.9% at Hormozgan and 4.2% in Mazandaran.

In the R2-M124-WTY and R-Arabia Y-DNA Projects, Haplogroup R-M124 has appeared in the following Arab countries: Kuwait (3 clusters), United Arab Emirates (1 cluster), Syria (1 cluster), and Tunisia (1 cluster).

Thus, Haplogroup R-M124 has been observed among Arabs at low frequencies in 11 countries/territories (Egypt, Jordan, Kuwait, Lebanon, Palestine, Qatar, Syria, Tunisia, United Arab Emirates, and Yemen) of the 22 Arab countries/territories so far. In the Kingdom of Saudi Arabia so far has one family identified to have Haplogroup R2A (R-M124) of its paternal genome or Y-Chromosome updated 5 January; 2018.

Frequency of Haplogroup R-M124 in the Arab World from DNA studies
	Count	Sample Size	R-M124 Frequency %
UAE	8	217	3.69%
Qatar	1	72	1.39%
Kuwait	1	153	0.65%
Yemen	1	104	0.96%
Jordan	2	146	1.37%
Lebanon	2	935	0.21%
Palestine	1	49	2.04%
Egypt	1	147	0.68%

== Position on the ISOGG tree and related SNPs ==
Haplogroup R-M124 is a subgroup of Haplogroup R-M479 (M479):

- R-M479 (M479)
  - R-M124 (M124, P249, P267, L266)
    - R-L295 (L295)
    - R-L263 (L263)
    - R-L1069 (L1069)

== Prediction with haplotypes ==
Haplotype can be used to predict haplogroup. The chances of any person part of this haplogroup is the highest if DYS391=10, DYS392=10 and DYS426=12.

== See also ==
- Genetics and Archaeogenetics of South Asia: R1a1 and R2
- Genealogical DNA test

=== Y-DNA R-M207 subclades ===
- R-L21
- R-L295
- R-M124
- R-M167
- R-M17
- R-M173
- R-M207
- R-M342
- R-M420
- R-M479
- R-U106
