= UgMicroSatdb =

Content
- Description: microsatellites from unigenes.

Contact
- Authors: Veenu Aishwarya
- Primary citation: Aishwarya & al. (2008)
- Release date: 2007

Access
- Website: http://veenuash.info/web1/index.htm.

UgMicroSatdb (UniGene Microsatellites database) is a database of microsatellites present in uniGene.

== See also ==
- Microsatellites
- Unigene
