= Hand–foot–genital syndrome =

- This condition is inherited in an autosomal dominant manner
- Specialty: Medical genetics

Hand–foot–genital syndrome (HFGS) is characterized by limb malformations and urogenital defects. Mild bilateral shortening of the thumbs and great toes, caused primarily by shortening of the distal phalanx and/or the first metacarpal or metatarsal, is the most common limb malformation and results in impaired dexterity or apposition of the thumbs. Urogenital abnormalities include abnormalities of the ureters and urethra and various degrees of incomplete Müllerian fusion in females and hypospadias of variable severity with or without chordee in males. Vesicoureteral reflux, recurrent urinary tract infections, and chronic pyelonephritis are common; fertility is normal.

== Cause ==
Hand–foot–genital syndrome is inherited in an autosomal dominant manner. The proportion of cases caused by de novo mutations is unknown because of the small number of individuals described. If a parent of the proband is affected, the risk to the siblings is 50%. When the parents are clinically unaffected, the risk to the sibs of a proband appears to be low. Each child of an individual with HFGS has a 50% chance of inheriting the mutation. Prenatal testing may be available through laboratories offering custom prenatal testing for families in which the disease-causing mutation has been identified in an affected family member.

== Diagnosis ==
Diagnosis is based on physical examination including radiographs of the hands and feet and imaging studies of the kidneys, bladder, and female reproductive tract. HOXA13 is the only gene known to be associated with HFGS. Approximately 60% of mutations are polyalanine expansions. Molecular genetic testing is clinically available.

=== Additional findings ===
Additional findings that may be present in HFGS according to the latest research are:

- Limited metacarpophalangeal flexion of the thumb or limited ability to oppose the thumb and fifth finger
- Hypoplastic thenar eminences
- Medial deviation of the great toe (hallux varus), a useful diagnostic sign when present
- Small great toenail
- Fifth-finger clinodactyly, secondary to a shortened middle phalanx
- Short feet
- Altered dermatoglyphics of the hands; when present, primarily involving distal placement of the axial triradius, lack of thenar or hypothenar patterning, low arches on the thumbs, thin ulnar loops (deficiency of radial loops and whorls), and a greatly reduced ridge count on the fingers

Radiographic findings

- Hypoplasia of the distal phalanx and first metacarpal of the thumbs and great toes
- Pointed distal phalanges of the thumb
- Lack of normal tufting of the distal phalanges of the great toes
- Fusions of the cuneiform bones to other tarsal bones or trapezium-scaphoid fusion of the carpals
- Short calcaneus
- Occasional bony fusions of the middle and distal phalanges of the second, third, fourth, or fifth toes
- Delayed carpal or tarsal maturation
- Metacarpophalangeal profile reflecting shortening of the first metacarpal, the first and second phalanges, and the second phalanx of the second and fifth digits

Urogenital Defects

Females may have the following:

- Vesicoureteral reflux secondary to ureteric incompetence
- Ectopic ureteral orifices
- Trigonal hypoplasia
- Hypospadiac urethra
- Subsymphyseal epispadias
- Patulous urethra
- Urinary incontinence (related to structural anomalies and weakness of the bladder sphincter muscle)
- Small hymenal opening
- Various degrees of incomplete Müllerian fusion with or without two cervices or a longitudinal vaginal septum

Males may have the following:

- Retrograde ejaculation (related to structural anomalies and weakness of the bladder sphincter muscle)

== Treatment ==
Hand–foot–genital syndrome often requires ureteric reimplantation and surgery to correct bladder outlet abnormalities. Less common treatments include hand and foot surgery, surgery to remove a longitudinal vaginal septum, and hymenectomy. In cases of repeated mid-trimester miscarriages, surgery may be needed to remove a uterine septum or reunify a bicornate uterus. Surgery or antibiotics may be used prophylactically to prevent urinary tract infections.
