= Unigene Laboratories =

Defunct American biopharmaceutical company that focused on peptides

- Company type: Public
- Traded as: OTC Pink No Information: /quote UGNEQ
- Industry: Biotechnology
- Founded: 1980
- Defunct: July 2, 2023
- Fate: Bankrupt
- Headquarters: New Jersey, United States
- Key people: Ashleigh Palmer (CEO); Gregory T. Mayes, Esq. (Vice President); Nozer Mehta (Vice President); Paul Shields (Vice President)
- Products: Research and development of peptides for medical purposes
- Number of employees: 53 (2020)
- Website: www.unigene.com

Unigene Laboratories was an American biopharmaceutical company, engaged in the research and development of peptides for medical purposes. The company was founded in 1980 and is located in New Jersey.

The company's primary focus is on the development of calcitonin and related peptides for the treatment of osteoporosis. The company has licensed worldwide rights to its oral parathyroid hormone ("PTH") to GlaxoSmithKline.

Unigene filed for Chapter 7 bankruptcy on July 2, 2013 in the United States Bankruptcy Court of the District of New Jersey. The Chapter 7 case is being administered under case No. 13-24696.

== See also ==
- UgMicroSatdb
