= Haplogroup R (Y-DNA) =

Human Y-chromosome DNA haplogroup

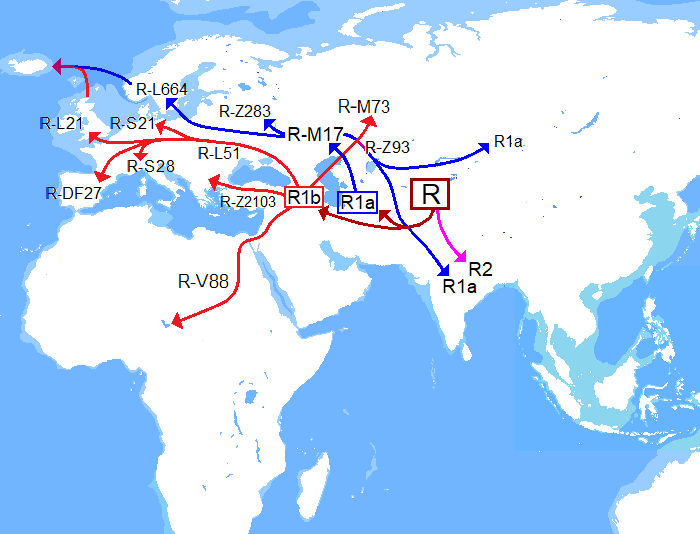
- Possible time of origin: about 31,900 years BP 35,000 or 30,000 years BP 27,000 years BP
- Possible place of origin: North Asia, Indian subcontinent, Central Asia, or Middle East
- Ancestor: P-M45 (P1c, formerly P1), one of the three primary clades of P* (P-F5850)
- Descendants: R1 (R-M173), R2 (R-M479) (R2)
- Defining mutations: M207/Page37/UTY2

Haplogroup R, or R-M207, is a Y-chromosome DNA haplogroup. It is both numerous and widespread among modern populations.

Some descendant subclades have been found since pre-history in Europe, Central Asia and South Asia. Others have long been present, at lower levels, in parts of West Asia and Africa. Some authorities have also suggested, more controversially, that R-M207 has long been present among Native Americans in North America – a theory that has not yet been widely accepted.

Haplogroup R originated about 31,900 or 35,000 years ago. According to Bergstorm et al, ancestors of haplogroup R and Q (Y-haplogroup K2b2/root P) split in Southeast Asia near Sahul.

== Structure ==
Human Y-DNA Phylogenetic Tree
Haplogroup R

- M207 (R)
  - M173 (R1)
    - M420 (R1a)
      - M459
        (R1a1)
      - (R1a*)
    - M343 (R1b)
      - L278
        (R1b1)
      - (R1b*)
  - M479 (R2)
    - M124 (R2a)
      - L263
        (R2a1)
      - F1092
        (R2a2)
      - Y12100
        (R2a3)
    - (R2*)

== Origins ==
Haplogroup R originated about 31,900 or 35,000 years ago. According to Bergström et al, ancestors of haplogroup R and Q (Y-haplogroup K2b2/root P) split in Southeast Asia near Sahul. The parent Haplogroup P1 may have emerged in Southeast Asia, however according to Karafet, et al. this hypothesis is "parsimonious" and it is just as likely that it originated elsewhere in Eurasia. The SNP M207, which defines Haplogroup R, is believed to have arisen during the Upper Paleolithic era, about 27,000 years ago.

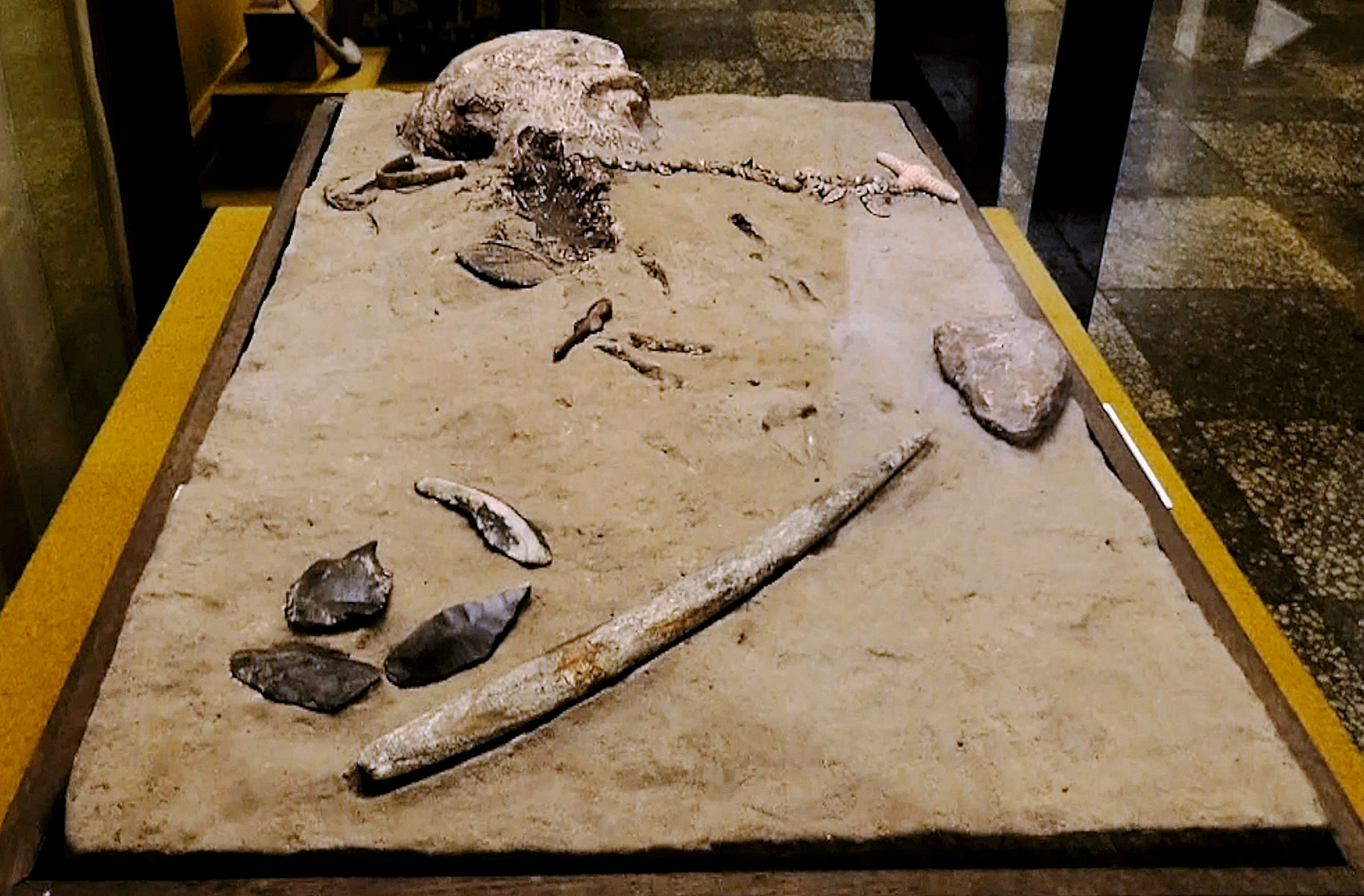
Remains of the Mal'ta boy (MA-1) with tomb artifacts, Hermitage Museum, Saint-Petersburg.

Only one confirmed example of basal R* has been found, in 24,000-year-old remains, known as MA1, found at Mal'ta–Buret' culture near Lake Baikal in Siberia. (While a living example of R-M207(xM17,M124) was reported in 2012, it was not tested for the SNP M478; the male concerned – among a sample of 158 ethnic Tajik males from Badakshan, Afghanistan – may therefore belong to R2.)

It is possible that neither of the primary branches of R-M207, namely R1 (R-M173) and R2 (R-M479) still exist in their basal, original forms, i.e. R1* and R2*. No confirmed case, either living or dead, has been reported in scientific literature. (Although in the case of R2*, relatively little research has been completed.)

Despite the rarity of R* and R1*, the relatively rapid expansion – geographically and numerically – of subclades from R1 in particular, has often been noted: "both R1a and R1b comprise young, star-like expansions" (Karafet 2008).

The wide geographical distribution of R1b, in particular, has also been noted. Hallast et al. (2014) mentioned that living examples found in Central Asia included:

- the "deepest subclade" of R-M269 (R1b1a1a2) – the most numerous branch of R1b in Western Europe, and;
- the rare subclade R-PH155 (R1b1b) found only in one Bhutanese individual and one Tajik.

(While Hallast et al. suggested that R-PH155 was "almost as old as the R1a/R1b split", R-PH155 was later discovered to be a subclade of R-L278 (R1b1) and has been given the phylogenetic name R1b1b.)

== Distribution ==
Y-haplogroup R-M207 is common throughout Europe, South Asia and Central Asia (Kayser 2003). It also occurs in the Caucasus and Siberia. Some minorities in Africa also carry subclades of R-M207 at high frequencies.

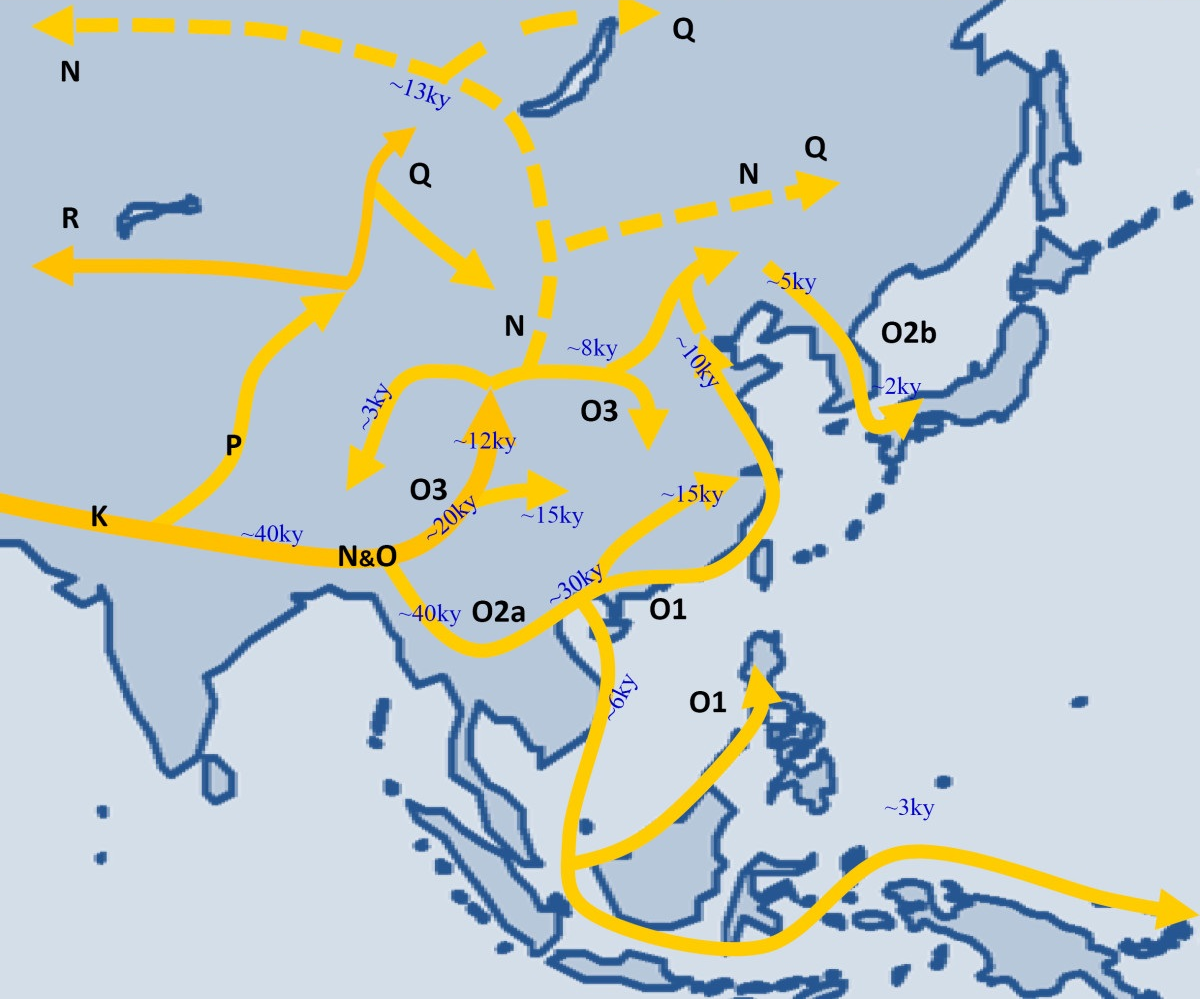
Proposed migration routes of Haplogroup P among others.

While some indigenous peoples of The Americas and Australasia also feature high levels of R-M207, it is unclear whether these are deep-rooted, or an effect of European colonisation during the early modern era.

=== R (R-M207) ===
Haplogroup R* Y-DNA (xR1,R2) was found in 24,000-year-old remains from Mal'ta in Siberia near Lake Baikal. In 2013, R-M207 was found in one out of 132 males from the Kyrgyz people of East Kyrgyzstan.

=== R1 (R-M173) ===
There are many downstream mutations of haplogroup R (Semino 2000 and Rosser 2000).

Initially, there was debate about the origin of haplogroup R1b in Native Americans. Two early studies suggested that this haplogroup could have been one of the founding Siberian lineages of Native Americans; however, this is now considered unlikely, because the R1b lineages commonly found in Native Americans are in most cases identical to those in western Europeans, and its highest concentration is found among a variety of culturally unaffiliated tribes, in eastern North America.

Thus, according to several authors, R1b was most likely introduced through admixture during the post-1492 European settlement of North America.

=== R2 (R-M479) ===
Haplogroup R-M479 is defined by the presence of the marker M479. The paragroup for the R-M479 lineage is found predominantly in South Asia, although deep-rooted examples have also been found among Portuguese, Spanish, Tatar (Bashkortostan, Russia), and Ossetian (Caucasus) populations (Myres 2010).

One rare subclade may occur only among Ashkenazi Jews, possibly as a result of a founder effect.

== See also ==
- Mal'ta–Buret' culture
- Prehistoric Asia
- Prehistoric Europe

=== Genetics ===
- Genetic history of Europe
- Genetics and archaeogenetics of South Asia
- Genetic history of the Middle East
- Conversion table for Y chromosome haplogroups
- Genetic genealogy
- Haplogroup
- Haplotype
- Human Y-chromosome DNA haplogroup
- Molecular phylogenetics
- Paragroup
- Subclade
- Y-chromosomal Aaron
- Y-chromosome haplogroups in populations of the world
- Y-DNA haplogroups in populations of Europe
- Y-DNA haplogroups in populations of the Near East
- Y-DNA haplogroups in populations of South Asia
- Y-DNA haplogroups in populations of North Africa
- Y-DNA haplogroups in populations of the Caucasus
- Y-DNA haplogroups by ethnic group

=== Y-DNA R-M207 subclades ===
- R-L21
- R-L295
- R-M124
- R-M327
- R-M17
- R-M173
- R-M207
- R-M342
- R-M343
- R-M420
- R-M479
- R-U106
