= Haplogroup R2 =

Human Y-chromosome DNA haplogroup

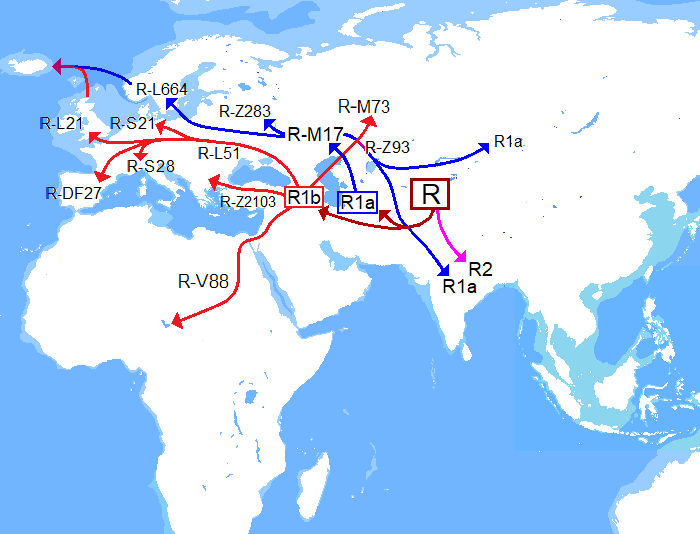
- Possible time of origin: 18,400 BP
- Possible place of origin: South Asia or Central Asia
- Ancestor: Haplogroup R
- Descendants: R2a (M124); R2b (FGC21706)
- Defining mutations: M479

Haplogroup R2, or R-M479, is a Y-chromosome haplogroup characterised by genetic marker M479. It is one of two primary descendants of Haplogroup R (R-M207), the other being R1 (R-M173).

R-M479, especially its downstream R2a (R-M124), has been concentrated geographically in South Asia, Central Asia and parts of the Middle East since prehistory. R2 (excluding R2a) appears to reach its highest levels among the Burusho people in North Pakistan.

R2 has much lower rates of sampling compared to its R1 counterpart with 399 branches downstream off R-M479, opposed to 46,529 for R-M173.

It has two primary branches: R2a (M124) and R2b (R-FGC21706)

== Structure ==
- R2 (M479/PF6107, L266/PF6108, L722, L726)
  - R2a (M124, F820/Page4, L381, P249)
    - R2a1 (L263)
    - R2a2 (P267/PF6109)
  - R2b (FGC21706, FGC50198, FGC50325, FGC50333, SK2163, SK2164, SK2165, SK2166)
    - R2b1 (FGC50339)

Source: ISOGG 2017.

=== Geographical distribution ===
Most research has tested only for the presence of R-M479 (R2) and R-M124 (R2a) – or SNPs downstream from M124 like P249, P267, L266, PAGES00004, and L381 SNPs). Because the other primary branch, R2b (R-FGC21706) was discovered later than R2a, it has often not been tested for. Hence most results are best described as R2(xR2a).

In addition, relatively little research has been done within South Asia, which is known to have the greatest concentration of R2. (Hence the figures cited in the table right may not be indicative of true frequencies, i.e. Pakistan is the only South Asian country that has been included.)

In 2013, R2(xR2a) was found in 5 out of 19 males from the Burusho minority of North Pakistan.

==== R2a (R-M124) ====
Haplogroup R2a (R-M124) is characterised by SNPs M124, F820/Page4, L381, P249, and is mainly found in South Asia, with lower frequencies in Central Asia, Middle East and the Caucasus. R-M124 is also found in multiple Jewish populations: Iraqi Jews, Persian Jews, Mountain Jews, and Ashkenazi Jews.

==== R2b (R-FGC21706/ R-FGC50231) ====
It is found especially in the Indian subcontinent. On FTDNA the greatest frequency of R-FGC50231 testers originate from Pakistan, with 2% of testers being classified as R-FGC50231, additionally other prominent nations include, India, Afghanistan and Tajikistan.

== Phylogenetic tree ==
- M479
  - R2*
  - M124
    R2a
  - FGC21706
    R2b

== Description of the SNP M479 ==
Common Name Marker	M479
YCC Haplogroup	R-M479
Nucleotide change	C to T
Amplicon size (bp) reference sequence	323
Polymorphism position from 5' end	107
Restriction enzyme variant	HphI
RefSNP ID	-
Y-position	19294055
Primer forward 5'-3'	gatactttatcaggcttacttc
Primer reverse 5'-3'	aaccaaatctctcagaatcg

== See also ==
=== Y-DNA R-M207 subclades ===
- R-L21
- R-L295
- R-M124
- R-M167
- R-M17
- R-M173
- R-M207
- R-M342
- R-M420
- R-M479
- R-U106
