= List of X-STR markers =

The following X-STR markers are used in genealogical DNA testing and other forms of relationship testing.

STR #	notes	DNA sequence repeat motif	alleles	mutation rate	links
DXS10011					
DXS10066	DXS10066 is also known as Penta X-16.				
DXS10067	DXS10067 is also known as Penta X-12.				
DXS10068	DXS10068 is also known as Penta X-13.				
DXS10069	DXS10069 is also known as Penta X-15.				
DXS10074					
DXS10075					
DXS10079					
DXS10129	DXS10129 is also known as Penta X-10.				
DXS10130	DXS10130 is also known as Penta X-3.				
DXS10131					
DXS10132	DXS10132 is also known as Penta X-17.				
DXS10133	DXS10133 is also known as Penta X-18.				
DXS6807					
DXS7132					
DXS7423					
DXS8377					
DXS981					
HPRTB					
Penta X-3	see DXS10130	—	—	—	—
Penta X-10	see DXS10129	—	—	—	—
Penta X-12	see DXS10067	—	—	—	—
Penta X-13	see DXS10068	—	—	—	—
Penta X-15	see DXS10069	—	—	—	—
Penta X-16	see DXS10066	—	—	—	—
Penta X-17	see DXS10132	—	—	—	—
Penta X-18	see DXS10133	—	—	—	—

== See also ==
- Short Tandem Repeat
- X-STR
- List of Y-STR markers
