= List of Y-STR markers =

The Y-STR markers in the following list are commonly used in forensic and genealogical DNA testing.

DYS454 is the least diverse, and multi-copy marker DYS464 is the most diverse Y-STR marker.

The location on the Y-chromosome of numbered Y-STR markers can be roughly given with cytogenetic localization. For example, DYS449 is located at Yp11.2 - meaning the Y-chromosome, petit arm, band 1, sub-band 1, sub-sub-band 2 - DYS449.

Forensic labs usually use PowerPlex Y (Promega Corporation) and Yfiler (Applied Biosystems) kits that examine 12 or 17 Y-STRs, respectively. Genealogical DNA test labs examine up to 700 Y-STRs.

== Mutation rates ==
Mutation rates are those per generation, as estimated in Chandler (2006). The quoted estimated errors are typically +/- 15-20%. Alternative estimates (for forensic use therefore not all markers are covered) from observed pedigrees are also available at the Y Chromosome Haplotype Reference Database.

It appears that some trinucleotide markers may have much higher mutation rates at some repeat lengths than at others. For example, variation of the trinucleotide DYS388 is generally very slow in most haplogroups, when it takes the values 11–13. But there appears to be much greater variation and more rapid mutation in Haplogroup J, where it typically has values 14–18. Similarly the trinucleotide DYS392 is reported to be "fast" in haplogroups N and Q, where it takes values 14-16 which are rare in other groups.

== Y-STR markers ==
STR	Notes	DNA sequence repeat motif	Alleles	Mutation rate	Links
DYS19=14	see DYS394	—	—	—	—
DYS385	DYS385 is a multi-copy marker, and includes DYS385a and DYS385b. The order of DYS385a and DYS385b may be reversed, their sequence is referred to as the Kittler order.	GAAA	13-18	0.00226	NIST fact sheet
DYS388		ATT	17	0.00022	
DYS389	DYS389 is a multi-copy marker, and includes DYS389i and DYS389ii. DYS389ii refers to the total length of DYS389. Therefore, when there is a one step mutation at DYS389i, it will also appear in DYS389ii.	(TCTG) (TCTA) (TCTG) (TCTA)	i:13 ii:30	0.00186, 0.00242	NIST fact sheet
DYS390		(TCTA) (TCTG)	23	0.00311	NIST fact sheet
DYS391		TCTA	11	0.00265	NIST fact sheet
DYS392		TAT	11	0.00052	NIST fact sheet
DYS393	DYS393 is also known as DYS395.	AGAT	12	0.00076	NIST fact sheet
DYS394	DYS394 is also known as DYS19.	TAGA	14	0.00151	NIST fact sheet
DYS413	Found in the Palindromic region of the Y DNA		21-22		
DYS425	DYS425, when it can be measured, is very stable. However it is actually one copy of a multiple part marker, DYF371 (below), and as such recLOH mutations can often make it unmeasurable when the other copies overwrite it. For example, it is associated with the defining SNP for I-M38 (I2a2a1a1; formerly I1b2a1), as the SNP M284 can render a null value at this marker. Most members of E-M96 and sub-clades also render null values. Nevertheless, it was one of the small number of markers originally offered by Oxford Ancestors, and Family Tree DNA later chose to offer it to genealogists also.	TGT	12		
DYS426		GTT	11	0.00009	NIST fact sheet
DYS434		TAAT (CTAT)	9		NIST fact sheet
DYS435		TGGA; 11			
DYS436		GTT	12		
DYS437		TCTA	14	0.00099	NIST fact sheet
DYS438		TTTTC	10	0.00055	NIST fact sheet
DYS439	DYS439 is also known as Y-GATA-A4. DYS439 is associated with the defining SNP for haplogroup R1b1c9a, as the SNP can render a null value at this marker.	AGAT	12	0.00477	NIST fact sheet
DYS441		CCTT	15		A novel multiplex PCR system
DYS442		TATC	11	0.00324	A novel multiplex PCR system
DYS443		TTCC; 0			
DYS444		TAGA	11		A novel multiplex PCR system
DYS445		TTTA	11		A novel multiplex PCR system
DYS446		TCTCT	14		Sorenson Marker Details
DYS447		TAAWA	26	0.00264	NIST fact sheet
DYS448		AGAGAT	20	0.00135	NIST fact sheet
DYS449		TTTC	25	0.00838	Sorenson Marker Details
DYS450		TTTTA	8		
DYS452		YATAC	29		
DYS453		AAAT	0		
DYS454	DYS454 is the least varying Y-STR marker commonly used in genealogical DNA testing. Of the entries for DYS454 at Ybase, 96% have 11 repeats, 3% have 10 repeats, and 2% have 12 repeats (source).	AAAT	11	0.00016	
DYS455		AAAT	11	0.00016	Sorenson Marker Details
DYS456		AGAT	14	0.00735	Sorenson Marker Details
DYS458		GAAA	18	0.00814	Sorenson Marker Details
DYS459	This is a multi-copy marker, and includes DYS459a and DYS459b.	TAAA	8-9	0.00132	
DYS460	DYS460 was originally known as Y-GATA-A7.1.	ATAG	10	0.00402	NIST fact sheet
DYS461	DYS461 was originally known as Y-GATA-A7.2.	(TAGA) CAGA	11		NIST fact sheet
DYS462		TATG	11		
DYS463		AARGG	22		
DYS464	DYS464 is a multi-copy palindromic marker. Men typically have four copies known in such cases as DYS464a, DYS464b, DYS464c, and DYS464d. There can be less than four copies, or more, which in such cases would be known as DYS464e, DYS464f, etc. DYS464 is the most diverse range of values of any Y-STR marker (source). This marker can also sometimes be typed with separate g-types and c-types to increase resolution. The type variance is based on a SNP that can be found in most R1b haplogroup males. It is part of the Palindromic region of Y DNA	CCTT	12-14-16-17	0.00566	Forensic value of the multicopy Y-STR marker DYS464 DYS464X testing DYS464 discrepancies
DYS481		CTT	26		
DYS485		TTA	15		
DYS487		ATT	13		
DYS490		TTA	12		
DYS494		TAT	9		
DYS495		AAT	15		
DYS497		TAT	15		
DYS504		14			
DYS505		TCCT	13		
DYS508		TATC	0		
DYS518		AAAG	0		NIST Comm. Kits
DYS520		ATAS	21		
DYS522		GATA	13		
DYS525		TAGA	10		
DYS531		AAAT	11		
DYS532		CTTT	10		
DYS533		ATCT	11		
DYS534		CTTT	15		
DYS540		TTAT	11		
DYS549		AGAT	13		
DYS556		AATA	12		
DYS557		TTTC	18		
DYS565		TAAA	11		
DYS570		TTTC	12-23	0.00790	
DYS572		AAAT	12		
DYS573		TTTA	0		
DYS575		AAAT	8-12		
DYS576		AAAG	17	0.01022	
DYS578		AAAT	8		
DYS589		TTATT	11		
DYS590		TTTTG	8		
DYS594		TAAAA	10		
DYS607		AAGG	14	0.00411	
DYS612					
DYS614					
DYS626		AAAG			
DYS627		AAAG	0		NIST Comm. Kits
DYS632		CATT	8		
DYS635	Also known as Y-GATA-C4	TSTA compound	21	0.0046	NIST fact sheet
DYS636			11		
DYS638		TTTA	11		
DYS641		TAAA	10		
DYS643		CTTTT	9		
DYS710		GAAA	36		
DYS714		TTTTC	25		
DYS716		CCATT	27		
DYS717		TGTAT	20		
DYS724	Palindromic; also known as CDY		33-35	0.03531	
DYS725	Palindromic				
DYS726	YSTR marker in the pericentromeric region.		12		
DYF371	DYF371 is a multicopy, palindromic region marker. Includes the DYS425 marker & can be informative in cases of null values at that marker.		12		
DYF385S1	Duplicated YSTR marker in close proximity to DYS459		8-9		
DYF387S1 a/b		RAAG	0		NIST Comm. Kits
DYF397	DYF397 is a palindromic region marker.				
DYF399	An asymmetric three allele STR locus that can be used to observe deletions and recombinational rearrangements in the palindromic region of the Y chromosome.		17-29 (many incomplete alleles)		nomenclature
DYF401	DYF401 is a palindromic region marker.				
DYF406S1			11		
DYF408	DYF408 is a palindromic region marker.				
DYF411	DYF411 is a palindromic region marker.				
DXYS156					
YCAII	YCAII is a multi-copy marker which includes YCAIIa & YCAIIb		22-22	0.00123	
Y-GATA-H4		TAGA	10	0.00208	NIST fact sheet
Y-GATA-C4	see DYS635				
Y-GATA-A10		TAGA	14		NIST fact sheet
Y-GGAAT-1B07			11		

== Y-STR allele nomenclatures ==
DNA testing companies or labs in certain cases use different nomenclatures to designate the same Y-STR allele. Thus, a conversion must be applied in these cases to accurately compare Y-STR results obtained from different companies. The most common nomenclature is based on guidance provided by NIST for Y-STR markers historically reported differently by various companies. The NIST standard is the proposal of ISOGG (International Society of Genetic Genealogy) for genetic genealogy companies.

== Notes and references ==
- Kayser et al. (2004), A Comprehensive Survey of Human Y-Chromosomal Microsatellites Am. J. Hum. Genet., 74 1183–1197. NB online only data file
- Krahn, Thomas. "Y-STR fingerprint - Panels" (PDF). Price List DNA-Fingerprint - Genealogy Testing Services. Archived from the original (PDF) on 27 March 2023.
- Butler, John M. (9 January 2012). "Y-Chromosome STRs". Short Tandem Repeat DNA. NIST Standard Reference Database SRD 130. Archived from the original on 5 Feb 2023.
- Butler, John; Kline, Decker (2009-06-29). "Summary List of Y Chromosome STR Loci and Available Fact Sheets". NIST Standard Reference Database SRD 130. Archived from the original on 9 June 2019.

== See also ==
- List of Y-DNA single-nucleotide polymorphisms
- List of X-STR markers
