= Microsatellite =

Repeating sequences of 2–13 base pairs of DNA

A microsatellite is a tract of repetitive DNA that consists of a particular sequence of base pairs repeated a large number of times. Microsatellites occur at thousands of locations within an organism's genome. They have a higher mutation rate than other areas of DNA leading to high genetic diversity. Microsatellites are often referred to as short tandem repeats (STRs) by forensic geneticists and in genetic genealogy, or as simple sequence repeats (SSRs) by plant geneticists.

Microsatellites and their longer cousins, the minisatellites, together are classified as VNTR (variable number of tandem repeats) DNA. The name "satellite" DNA refers to the early observation that centrifugation of genomic DNA in a test tube separates a prominent layer of bulk DNA from accompanying "satellite" layers of repetitive DNA.

They are widely used for DNA profiling in cancer diagnosis, in kinship analysis (especially paternity testing) and in forensic identification. They are also used in genetic linkage analysis to locate a gene or a mutation responsible for a given trait or disease. Microsatellites are also used in population genetics to measure levels of relatedness between subspecies, groups and individuals.

== History ==
Although the first microsatellite was characterised in 1984 at the University of Leicester by Weller, Jeffreys and colleagues as a polymorphic GGAT repeat in the human myoglobin gene, the term "microsatellite" was introduced later, in 1989, by Litt and Luty. The increasing availability of DNA amplification by PCR at the beginning of the 1990s triggered a large number of studies using the amplification of microsatellites as genetic markers for forensic medicine, for paternity testing, and for positional cloning to find the gene underlying a trait or disease. Prominent early applications include the identifications by microsatellite genotyping of the eight-year-old skeletal remains of a British murder victim (Hagelberg et al. 1991), and of the Auschwitz concentration camp doctor Josef Mengele who escaped to South America following World War II (Jeffreys et al. 1992).

== Structures, locations, and functions ==
The repeating element of a microsatellite is short: generally ten nucleotides or less (a precise upper bound, the point at which a microsatellite becomes a minisatellite, is not explicitly defined and varies from author to author), and are typically repeated 5–50 times. For example, the sequence TATATATATA is a dinucleotide microsatellite, and GTCGTCGTCGTCGTC is a trinucleotide microsatellite (with A being Adenine, G Guanine, C Cytosine, and T Thymine). Repeat units of four and five nucleotides are referred to as tetra- and pentanucleotide motifs, respectively. Most eukaryotes have microsatellites, with the notable exception of some yeast species. Microsatellites are distributed throughout the genome. The human genome for example contains 50,000–100,000 dinucleotide microsatellites, and lesser numbers of tri-, tetra- and pentanucleotide microsatellites. Many are located in non-coding parts of the human genome and therefore do not produce proteins, but they can also be located in regulatory regions and coding regions.

Microsatellites in non-coding regions may not have any specific function, and therefore might not be selected against; this allows them to accumulate mutations unhindered over the generations and gives rise to variability that can be used for DNA fingerprinting and identification purposes. Other microsatellites are located in regulatory flanking or intronic regions of genes, or directly in codons of genes – microsatellite mutations in such cases can lead to phenotypic changes and diseases, notably in triplet expansion diseases such as fragile X syndrome and Huntington's disease.

Telomeres are linear sequences of DNA that sit at the very ends of chromosomes and protect the integrity of genomic material (not unlike an aglet on the end of a shoelace) during successive rounds of cell division due to the "end replication problem". In white blood cells, the gradual shortening of telomeric DNA has been shown to inversely correlate with ageing in several sample types. Telomeres consist of repetitive DNA, with the hexanucleotide repeat motif TTAGGG in vertebrates. They are thus classified as minisatellites. Similarly, insects have shorter repeat motifs in their telomeres that could arguably be considered microsatellites.

== Mutation mechanisms and mutation rates ==
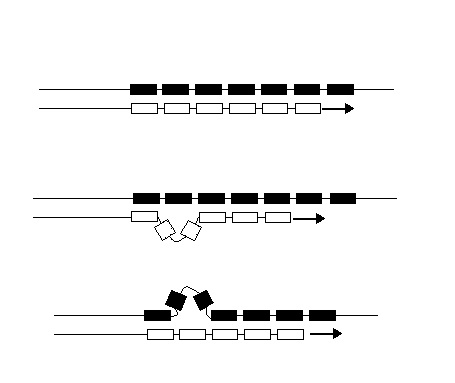
DNA strand slippage during replication of an STR locus. Boxes symbolize repetitive DNA units. Arrows indicate the direction in which a new DNA strand (white boxes) is being replicated from the template strand (black boxes). Three situations during DNA replication are depicted. (a) Replication of the STR locus has proceeded without a mutation. (b) Replication of the STR locus has led to a gain of one unit owing to a loop in the new strand; the aberrant loop is stabilized by flanking units complementary to the opposite strand. (c) Replication of the STR locus has led to a loss of one unit owing to a loop in the template strand. (Forster et al. 2015)

Unlike point mutations, which affect only a single nucleotide, microsatellite mutations lead to the gain or loss of an entire repeat unit, and sometimes two or more repeats simultaneously. Thus, the mutation rate at microsatellite loci is expected to differ from other mutation rates, such as base substitution rates. The mutation rate at microsatellite loci depends on the repeat motif sequence, the number of repeated motif units and the purity of the canonical repeated sequence. A variety of mechanisms for mutation of microsatellite loci have been reviewed, and their resulting polymorphic nature has been quantified. The actual cause of mutations in microsatellites is debated.

One proposed cause of such length changes is replication slippage, caused by mismatches between DNA strands while being replicated during meiosis. DNA polymerase, the enzyme responsible for reading DNA during replication, can slip while moving along the template strand and continue at the wrong nucleotide. DNA polymerase slippage is more likely to occur when a repetitive sequence (such as CGCGCG) is replicated. Because microsatellites consist of such repetitive sequences, DNA polymerase may make errors at a higher rate in these sequence regions. Several studies have found evidence that slippage is the cause of microsatellite mutations. Typically, slippage in each microsatellite occurs about once per 1,000 generations. Thus, slippage changes in repetitive DNA are three orders of magnitude more common than point mutations in other parts of the genome. Most slippage results in a change of just one repeat unit, and slippage rates vary for different allele lengths and repeat unit sizes, and within different species. If there is a large size difference between individual alleles, then there may be increased instability during recombination at meiosis.

Another possible cause of microsatellite mutations are point mutations, where only one nucleotide is incorrectly copied during replication. A study comparing human and primate genomes found that most changes in repeat number in short microsatellites appear due to point mutations rather than slippage.

=== Microsatellite mutation rates ===
Direct estimates of microsatellite mutation rates have been made in numerous organisms, from insects to humans. In the desert locust Schistocerca gregaria, the microsatellite mutation rate was estimated at 2.1 × 10^{−4} per generation per locus. The microsatellite mutation rate in human male germ lines is five to six times higher than in female germ lines and ranges from 0 to 7 × 10^{−3} per locus per gamete per generation. In the nematode Pristionchus pacificus, the estimated microsatellite mutation rate ranges from 8.9 × 10^{−5} to 7.5 × 10^{−4} per locus per generation.

Microsatellite mutation rates vary with base position relative to the microsatellite, repeat type, and base identity. Mutation rate rises specifically with repeat number, peaking around six to eight repeats and then decreasing again. Increased heterozygosity in a population will also increase microsatellite mutation rates, especially when there is a large length difference between alleles. This is likely due to homologous chromosomes with arms of unequal lengths causing instability during meiosis.

== Biological effects of microsatellite mutations ==
Many microsatellites are located in non-coding DNA and are biologically silent. Others are located in regulatory or even coding DNA – microsatellite mutations in such cases can lead to phenotypic changes and diseases. A genome-wide study estimates that microsatellite variation contributes 10–15% of heritable gene expression variation in humans.

=== Effects on proteins ===
In mammals, 20–40% of proteins contain repeating sequences of amino acids encoded by short sequence repeats. Most of the short sequence repeats within protein-coding portions of the genome have a repeating unit of three nucleotides, since that length will not cause frame-shifts when mutating. Each trinucleotide repeating sequence is transcribed into a repeating series of the same amino acid. In yeasts, the most common repeated amino acids are glutamine, glutamic acid, asparagine, aspartic acid and serine.

Mutations in these repeating segments can affect the physical and chemical properties of proteins, with the potential for producing gradual and predictable changes in protein action. For example, length changes in tandemly repeating regions in the Runx2 gene lead to differences in facial length in domesticated dogs (Canis familiaris), with an association between longer sequence lengths and longer faces. This association also applies to a wider range of Carnivora species. Length changes in polyalanine tracts within the HOXA13 gene are linked to hand-foot-genital syndrome, a developmental disorder in humans. Length changes in other triplet repeats are linked to more than 40 neurological diseases in humans, notably trinucleotide repeat disorders such as fragile X syndrome and Huntington's disease. Evolutionary changes from replication slippage also occur in simpler organisms. For example, microsatellite length changes are common within surface membrane proteins in yeast, providing rapid evolution in cell properties. Specifically, length changes in the FLO1 gene control the level of adhesion to substrates. Short sequence repeats also provide rapid evolutionary change to surface proteins in pathenogenic bacteria; this may allow them to keep up with immunological changes in their hosts. Length changes in short sequence repeats in a fungus (Neurospora crassa) control the duration of its circadian clock cycles.

=== Effects on gene regulation ===
Length changes of microsatellites within promoters and other cis-regulatory regions can change gene expression quickly, between generations. The human genome contains many (>16,000) short sequence repeats in regulatory regions, which provide 'tuning knobs' on the expression of many genes.

Length changes in bacterial SSRs can affect fimbriae formation in Haemophilus influenzae, by altering promoter spacing. Dinucleotide microsatellites are linked to abundant variation in cis-regulatory control regions in the human genome. Microsatellites in control regions of the Vasopressin 1a receptor gene in voles influence their social behavior, and level of monogamy.

In Ewing sarcoma (a type of painful bone cancer in young humans), a point mutation has created an extended GGAA microsatellite which binds a transcription factor, which in turn activates the EGR2 gene which drives the cancer. In addition, other GGAA microsatellites may influence the expression of genes that contribute to the clinical outcome of Ewing sarcoma patients.

=== Effects within introns ===
Microsatellites within introns also influence phenotype, through means that are not currently understood. For example, a GAA triplet expansion in the first intron of the X25 gene appears to interfere with transcription, and causes Friedreich's ataxia. Tandem repeats in the first intron of the Asparagine synthetase gene are linked to acute lymphoblastic leukaemia. A repeat polymorphism in the fourth intron of the NOS3 gene is linked to hypertension in a Tunisian population. Reduced repeat lengths in the EGFR gene are linked with osteosarcomas.

An archaic form of splicing preserved in zebrafish is known to use microsatellite sequences within intronic mRNA for the removal of introns in the absence of U2AF2 and other splicing machinery. It is theorized that these sequences form highly stable cloverleaf configurations that bring the 3' and 5' intron splice sites into close proximity, effectively replacing the spliceosome. This method of RNA splicing is believed to have diverged from human evolution at the formation of tetrapods and to represent an artifact of an RNA world.

=== Effects within transposons ===
Almost 50% of the human genome is contained in various types of transposable elements (also called transposons, or 'jumping genes'), and many of them contain repetitive DNA. It is probable that short sequence repeats in those locations are also involved in the regulation of gene expression.

== Applications ==
Microsatellites are used for assessing chromosomal DNA deletions in cancer diagnosis. Microsatellites are widely used for DNA profiling, also known as "genetic fingerprinting", of crime stains (in forensics) and of tissues (in transplant patients). They are also widely used in kinship analysis (most commonly in paternity testing). Also, microsatellites are used for mapping locations within the genome, specifically in genetic linkage analysis to locate a gene or a mutation responsible for a given trait or disease. As a special case of mapping, they can be used for studies of gene duplication or deletion. Researchers use microsatellites in population genetics and in species conservation projects. Plant geneticists have proposed the use of microsatellites for marker assisted selection of desirable traits in plant breeding.

=== Cancer diagnosis ===
In tumour cells, whose controls on replication are damaged, microsatellites may be gained or lost at an especially high frequency during each round of mitosis. Hence a tumour cell line might show a different genetic fingerprint from that of the host tissue, and, especially in colorectal cancer, might present with loss of heterozygosity. Microsatellites analyzed in primary tissue therefore been routinely used in cancer diagnosis to assess tumour progression. Genome Wide Association Studies (GWAS) have been used to identify microsatellite biomarkers as a source of genetic predisposition in a variety of cancers.

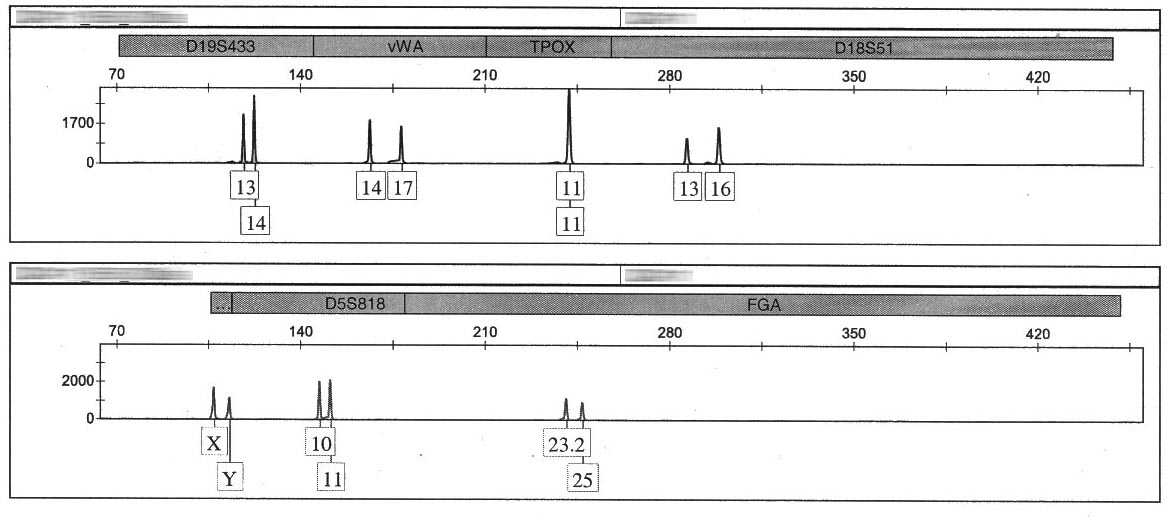
A partial human STR profile obtained using the Applied Biosystems Identifiler kit

=== Forensic and medical fingerprinting ===
Microsatellite analysis became popular in the field of forensics in the 1990s. It is used for the genetic fingerprinting of individuals where it permits forensic identification (typically matching a crime stain to a victim or perpetrator). It is also used to follow up bone marrow transplant patients.

The microsatellites in use today for forensic analysis are all tetra- or penta-nucleotide repeats, as these give a high degree of error-free data while being short enough to survive degradation in non-ideal conditions. Even shorter repeat sequences would tend to suffer from artifacts such as PCR stutter and preferential amplification, while longer repeat sequences would suffer more highly from environmental degradation and would amplify less well by PCR. Another forensic consideration is that the person's medical privacy must be respected, so that forensic STRs are chosen which are non-coding, do not influence gene regulation, and are not usually trinucleotide STRs which could be involved in triplet expansion diseases such as Huntington's disease. Forensic STR profiles are stored in DNA databanks such as the UK National DNA Database (NDNAD), the American CODIS or the Australian NCIDD.

=== Kinship analysis (paternity testing) ===
Autosomal microsatellites are widely used for DNA profiling in kinship analysis (most commonly in paternity testing). Paternally inherited Y-STRs (microsatellites on the Y chromosome) are often used in genealogical DNA testing.

=== Genetic linkage analysis ===
During the 1990s and the first several years of this millennium, microsatellites were the workhorse genetic markers for genome-wide scans to locate any gene responsible for a given phenotype or disease, using segregation observations across generations of a sampled pedigree. Although the rise of higher throughput and cost-effective single-nucleotide polymorphism (SNP) platforms led to the era of the SNP for genome scans, microsatellites remain highly informative measures of genomic variation for linkage and association studies. Their continued advantage lies in their greater allelic diversity than biallelic SNPs, thus microsatellites can differentiate alleles within a SNP-defined linkage disequilibrium block of interest. Thus, microsatellites have successfully led to discoveries of type 2 diabetes (TCF7L2) and prostate cancer genes (the 8q21 region).

=== Population genetics ===
Consensus neighbor-joining tree of 249 human populations and six chimpanzee populations. Created based on 246 microsatellite markers.

Microsatellites were popularized in population genetics during the 1990s because as PCR became ubiquitous in laboratories researchers were able to design primers and amplify sets of microsatellites at low cost. Their uses are wide-ranging. A microsatellite with a neutral evolutionary history makes it applicable for measuring or inferring bottlenecks, local adaptation, the allelic fixation index (F_{ST}), population size, and gene flow. As next generation sequencing becomes more affordable the use of microsatellites has decreased, however they remain a crucial tool in the field.

=== Plant breeding ===
Marker assisted selection or marker aided selection (MAS) is an indirect selection process where a trait of interest is selected based on a marker (morphological, biochemical or DNA/RNA variation) linked to a trait of interest (e.g. productivity, disease resistance, stress tolerance, and quality), rather than on the trait itself. Microsatellites have been proposed to be used as such markers to assist plant breeding.

== Analysis ==
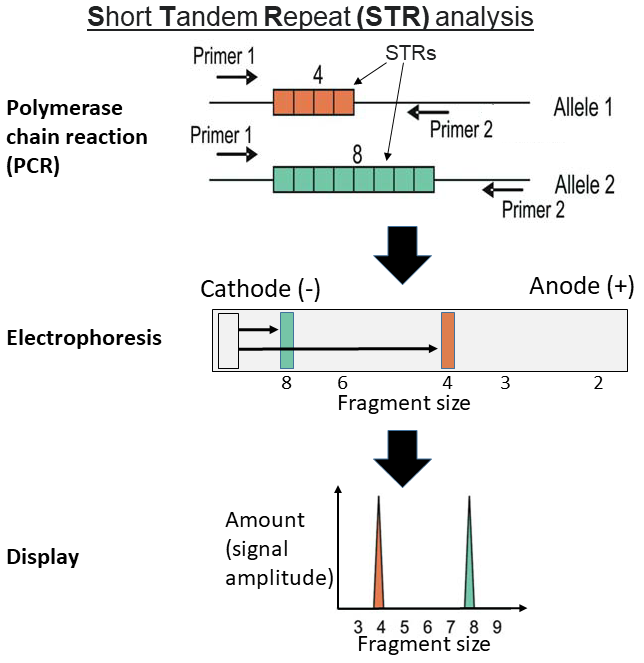
Short Tandem Repeat (STR) analysis on a simplified model using polymerase chain reaction (PCR): First, a DNA sample undergoes PCR with primers targeting certain STRs (which vary in lengths between individuals and their alleles). The resultant fragments are separated by size (such as electrophoresis).

Repetitive DNA is not easily analysed by next generation DNA sequencing methods, for some technologies struggle with homopolymeric tracts. A variety of software approaches have been created for the analysis or raw nextgen DNA sequencing reads to determine the genotype and variants at repetitive loci. Microsatellites can be analysed and verified by established PCR amplification and amplicon size determination, sometimes followed by Sanger DNA sequencing.

In forensics, the analysis is performed by extracting nuclear DNA from the cells of a sample of interest, then amplifying specific polymorphic regions of the extracted DNA by means of the polymerase chain reaction. Once these sequences have been amplified, they are resolved either through gel electrophoresis or capillary electrophoresis, which will allow the analyst to determine how many repeats of the microsatellites sequence in question there are. If the DNA was resolved by gel electrophoresis, the DNA can be visualized either by silver staining (low sensitivity, safe, inexpensive), or an intercalating dye such as ethidium bromide (fairly sensitive, moderate health risks, inexpensive), or as most modern forensics labs use, fluorescent dyes (highly sensitive, safe, expensive). Instruments built to resolve microsatellite fragments by capillary electrophoresis also use fluorescent dyes. Forensic profiles are stored in major databanks. The British data base for microsatellite loci identification was originally based on the British SGM+ system using 10 loci and a sex marker. The Americans increased this number to 13 loci. The Australian database is called the NCIDD, and since 2013 it has been using 18 core markers for DNA profiling.

=== Amplification ===
Microsatellites can be amplified for identification by the polymerase chain reaction (PCR) process, using the unique sequences of flanking regions as primers. DNA is repeatedly denatured at a high temperature to separate the double strand, then cooled to allow annealing of primers and the extension of nucleotide sequences through the microsatellite. This process results in production of enough DNA to be visible on agarose or polyacrylamide gels; only small amounts of DNA are needed for amplification because in this way thermocycling creates an exponential increase in the replicated segment. With the abundance of PCR technology, primers that flank microsatellite loci are simple and quick to use, but the development of correctly functioning primers is often a tedious and costly process.

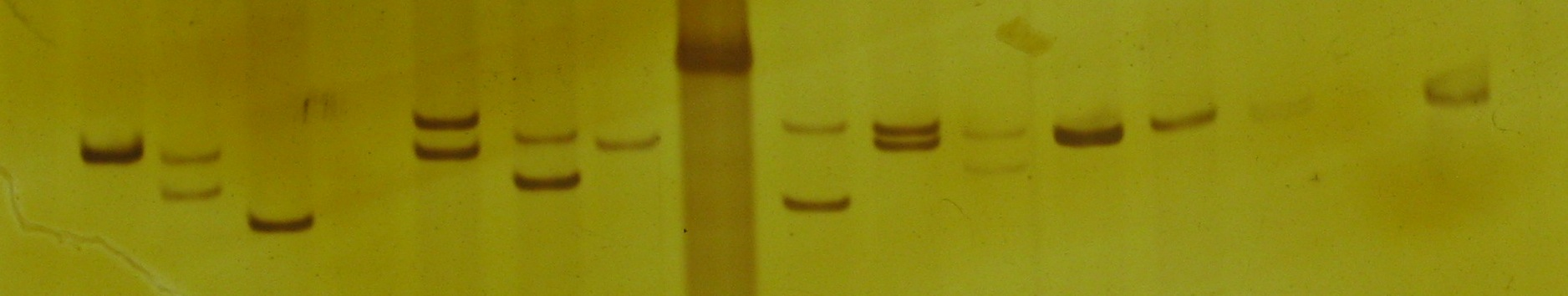
A number of DNA samples from specimens of Littorina plena amplified using polymerase chain reaction with primers targeting a variable simple sequence repeat (SSR, a.k.a. microsatellite) locus. Samples were run on a 5% polyacrylamide gel and visualized using silver staining.

=== Design of microsatellite primers ===
If searching for microsatellite markers in specific regions of a genome, for example within a particular intron, primers can be designed manually. This involves searching the genomic DNA sequence for microsatellite repeats, which can be done by eye or by using automated tools such as repeat masker. Once the potentially useful microsatellites are determined, the flanking sequences can be used to design oligonucleotide primers which will amplify the specific microsatellite repeat in a PCR reaction.

Random microsatellite primers can be developed by cloning random segments of DNA from the focal species. These random segments are inserted into a plasmid or bacteriophage vector, which is in turn implanted into Escherichia coli bacteria. Colonies are then developed, and screened with fluorescently–labelled oligonucleotide sequences that will hybridize to a microsatellite repeat, if present on the DNA segment. If positive clones can be obtained from this procedure, the DNA is sequenced and PCR primers are chosen from sequences flanking such regions to determine a specific locus. This process involves significant trial and error on the part of researchers, as microsatellite repeat sequences must be predicted and primers that are randomly isolated may not display significant polymorphism. Microsatellite loci are widely distributed throughout the genome and can be isolated from semi-degraded DNA of older specimens, as all that is needed is a suitable substrate for amplification through PCR.

More recent techniques involve using oligonucleotide sequences consisting of repeats complementary to repeats in the microsatellite to "enrich" the DNA extracted (microsatellite enrichment). The oligonucleotide probe hybridizes with the repeat in the microsatellite, and the probe/microsatellite complex is then pulled out of solution. The enriched DNA is then cloned as normal, but the proportion of successes will now be much higher, drastically reducing the time required to develop the regions for use. However, which probes to use can be a trial and error process in itself.

=== ISSR-PCR ===
ISSR (for inter-simple sequence repeat) is a general term for a genome region between microsatellite loci. The complementary sequences to two neighboring microsatellites are used as PCR primers; the variable region between them gets amplified. The limited length of amplification cycles during PCR prevents excessive replication of overly long contiguous DNA sequences, so the result will be a mix of a variety of amplified DNA strands which are generally short but vary much in length.

Sequences amplified by ISSR-PCR can be used for DNA fingerprinting. Since an ISSR may be a conserved or nonconserved region, this technique is not useful for distinguishing individuals, but rather for phylogeography analyses or maybe delimiting species; sequence diversity is lower than in SSR-PCR, but still higher than in actual gene sequences. In addition, microsatellite sequencing and ISSR sequencing are mutually assisting, as one produces primers for the other.

=== Limitations ===
Repetitive DNA is not easily analysed by next generation DNA sequencing methods, which struggle with homopolymeric tracts. Therefore, microsatellites are normally analysed by conventional PCR amplification and amplicon size determination. The use of PCR means that microsatellite length analysis is prone to PCR limitations like any other PCR-amplified DNA locus. A particular concern is the occurrence of 'null alleles':

- Occasionally, within a sample of individuals such as in paternity testing casework, a mutation in the DNA flanking the microsatellite can prevent the PCR primer from binding and producing an amplicon (creating a "null allele" in a gel assay), thus only one allele is amplified (from the non-mutated sister chromosome), and the individual may then falsely appear to be homozygous. This can cause confusion in paternity casework. It may then be necessary to amplify the microsatellite using a different set of primers. Null alleles are caused especially by mutations at the 3' section, where extension commences.
- In species or population analysis, for example in conservation work, PCR primers which amplify microsatellites in one individual or species can work in other species. However, the risk of applying PCR primers across different species is that null alleles become likely, whenever sequence divergence is too great for the primers to bind. The species may then artificially appear to have a reduced diversity. Null alleles in this case can sometimes be indicated by an excessive frequency of homozygotes causing deviations from Hardy-Weinberg equilibrium expectations.

== See also ==
- Genetic marker
- Junk DNA
- List of biological databases
- Long interspersed nucleotide elements
- Microsatellite instability
- Mobile element
- Satellite DNA
- Short interspersed repetitive element
- Simple sequence length polymorphism (SSLP)—a search tool
- Snpstr
- Strbase
- Earth Human STR Allele Frequencies Database
- Transposon
- UgMicroSatdb
