= STR multiplex system =

An STR multiplex system is used to identify specific short tandem repeats (STRs). STR polymorphisms are genetic markers that may be used to identify a DNA sequence.

The FBI analyses 13 specific STR loci for their database. These may be used in many areas of genetics in addition to their forensic uses.

One can think of a STR multiplex system as a collection of specific STRs which are positionally conserved on a target genome. Hence these can be used as markers. A number of different STRs along with their loci in a particular genome can be used for genotyping.

For example, the STR multiplex system AmpFlSTR Profiler Plus which analyses nine different STRs (3S1358, vWA, FGA, D8S1179, D21S11, D18S51, D5S818, D13S317, D7S820) plus Amelogenin for sex determination is used for human identification purposes.
