= List of R1a frequency by population =

2009 as per Underhill et al. (2009)

- R1a M420
  - R1a1 SRY1532.2
    - - R1a1*
    - R1a1a M17, M198
      - R1a1a *
      - M56
        R1a1a1
      - M157
        R1a1a2
      - M64.2,..
        R1a1a3
      - P98
        R1a1a4
      - PK5
        R1a1a5
      - M434
        R1a1a6
      - M458
        - M334
          R1a1a7a
        - R1a1a7*
      - rs34351054
        R1a1a8
  - - R1a*

Haplogroup R1a is one of the major classifications (called clades) of Y-chromosome types found in human male lines. It is widespread all across Eurasia. Many sample studies therefore carry information on the incidence of R1a and/or its subclassifications, in particular the dominant branching line represented by the haplogroups R1a1 and R1a1a.

The table below collates information from a number of such sample studies, with incidence frequencies in sample data reported as percentages, along with the associated sample sizes.

Continent/ Region	Country	Population	Sample	R1a1 = SRY1532.2 positive			Source
Continent/ Region	Country	Population	Sample	R1a1 M17/M198 not tested	R1a1* M17/M198 negative	R1a1a M17/M198 positive	Source
Caucasus	Russia	Ossetian	134	NA	0.00	0.75	Underhill et al. (2009)
Europe	Estonia		100	NA	0.00	35.00	Underhill et al. (2009)
Europe	Romania		335	NA	0.00	17.01	Underhill et al. (2009)
Europe	Croatia	Krk (island)	74	NA	0.00	36.49	Underhill et al. (2009)
Europe	Croatia	Brac (island)	49	NA	0.00	24.49	Underhill et al. (2009)
Europe	Croatia	Hvar (island)	91	NA	0.00	6.59	Underhill et al. (2009)
Europe	Croatia	Korcula (island)	134	NA	0.00	15.67	Underhill et al. (2009)
Europe	Croatia		108	NA	0.00	26.85	Underhill et al. (2009)
Europe	Bosnia-Herzegovina	Herzegovina	141	NA	0.00	12.06	Underhill et al. (2009)
Europe	Kosovo	Albanians	114	NA	0.00	3.51	Underhill et al. (2009)
Europe	Serbia		113	NA	0.00	18.58	Underhill et al. (2009)
Europe	Republic of Macedonia	Macedonia	79	NA	0.00	13.92	Underhill et al. (2009)
Europe	Czech Republic		53	NA	0.00	37.74	Underhill et al. (2009)
Europe	Belarus	Brest	97	NA	0.00	58.8	
Europe	Belarus		267	NA	0.00	54.7	
Europe	Belarus		50	NA	0.00	42.00	Underhill et al. (2009)
Europe	Russia	Russians	40	NA	0.00	38.46	Underhill et al. (2009)
Central Asia	Tajiks, Turkmens		38	NA	0.00	7.89	Underhill et al. (2009)
North Asia	Russia	Tuvans	104	NA	0.00	7.69	Underhill et al. (2009)
North Asia	Russia	Altai	58	NA	0.00	41.38	Underhill et al. (2009)
South Asia	India	Brahmin (Jammu)	61	NA	0.00	37.70	Underhill et al. (2009)
South Asia	India	Brahmin (Uttar Pradesh)	68	NA	0.00	39.71	Underhill et al. (2009)
South Asia	India	Brahmin (Andhra Pradesh)	19	NA	0.00	26.32	Underhill et al. (2009)
South Asia	India	Brahmin (Andhra Pradesh Aaruvela Niyogi & Vaidiki Brahmins)	20	NA	0.00	55.00	Syama (2012)
South Asia	India	Brahmin (Andhra Pradesh Dravida Brahmins)	37	NA	0.00	13.5	Syama (2012)
South Asia	India	Brahmin (Madhya Pradesh)	54	NA	0.00	35.19	Underhill et al. (2009)
South Asia	India	Khatri (Punjab/Haryana)	15	NA	0.00	67.00	Underhill et al. (2009)
South Asia	India	Bhanusali (Gujarat)	6	NA	0.00	67.00	Underhill et al. (2009)
South Asia	India	Ahir (Punjab/Haryana)	24	NA	0.00	63.00	Underhill et al. (2009)
South Asia	India	Brahmin (Uttar Pradesh)	171	NA	0.00	49.71	Underhill et al. (2009)
South Asia	India	Brahmin (Uttarakhand)	21	NA	0.00	47.62	Underhill et al. (2009)
South Asia	India	Brahmin (West Bengal)	49	NA	0.00	48.98	Underhill et al. (2009)
South Asia	India	Balmiki (Punjab/Haryana)	24	NA	0.00	33.00	Underhill et al. (2009)
South Asia	India	Rabari (Gujarat)	34	NA	0.00	32.00	Underhill et al. (2009)
South Asia	India	Dungari Bhil (Gujarat)	50	NA	0.00	26.00	Underhill et al. (2009)
South Asia	India	Kathodi (Gujarat)	15	NA	0.00	40.00	Underhill et al. (2009)
South Asia	India	Dungari Grassia (Gujarat)	51	NA	0.00	29.00	Underhill et al. (2009)
South Asia	India	Koli (Gujarat)	24	NA	0.00	21.00	Underhill et al. (2009)
South Asia	India	Meena (Rajasthan)	56	NA	0.00	38.00	Underhill et al. (2009)
South Asia	India	Meo	16	NA	0.00	31.00	Underhill et al. (2009)
South Asia	India	Manipuri	6	NA	0.00	50.00	Underhill et al. (2009)
South Asia	India	Asur	88	NA	0.00	5.68	Underhill et al. (2009)
South Asia	India	Ho	45	NA	0.00	0.00	Underhill et al. (2009)
South Asia	India	Mawasi (Jharkhand)	27	NA	0.00	3.70	Underhill et al. (2009)
South Asia	India	Mawasi (Madhya Pradesh)	12	NA	0.00	8.33	Underhill et al. (2009)
South Asia	India	Mahali (Jharkhand)	32	NA	0.00	9.38	Underhill et al. (2009)
South Asia	India	Santal (Jharkhand)	20	NA	0.00	10.00	Underhill et al. (2009)
South Asia	India	Birhor (Chhattisgarh)	27	NA	0.00	3.70	Underhill et al. (2009)
South Asia	India	Birhor (Maharashtra)	35	NA	0.00	2.86	Underhill et al. (2009)
South Asia	India	Baiga (Madhya Pradesh)	23	NA	0.00	8.70	Underhill et al. (2009)
South Asia	India	Baiga (Odisha)	42	NA	0.00	2.38	Underhill et al. (2009)
South Asia	India	Kharia (Chhattisgarh)	37	NA	0.00	5.41	Underhill et al. (2009)
South Asia	India	Savara (Odisha)	21	NA	0.00	9.52	Underhill et al. (2009)
South Asia	India	Meghwal (Rajasthan)	50	NA	0.00	30.00	Underhill et al. (2009)
South Asia	India	Garo (Meghalaya)	25	NA	0.00	4.00	Underhill et al. (2009)
South Asia	India	Khasi (Meghalaya)	21	NA	0.00	4.76	Underhill et al. (2009)
South Asia	India	Lohana (Gujarat)	20	NA	0.00	60.00	Underhill et al. (2009)
Middle East	Iran		87	NA	0.00	10.34	Underhill et al. (2009)
South Asia	Pakistan	Brahui	111	NA	0.00	35.00	Underhill et al. (2009)
South Asia	Pakistan	Burusho	96	NA	0.00	25.00	Underhill et al. (2009)
South Asia	Pakistan	Kashmiri	10	NA	0.00	50.00	Underhill et al. (2009)
South Asia	Pakistan	Makrani	60	NA	0.00	25.00	Underhill et al. (2009)
South Asia	Pakistan	Mohana	70	NA	0.00	71.00	Underhill et al. (2009)
South Asia	Pakistan	Parsi	90	NA	0.00	8.00	Underhill et al. (2009)
South Asia	Pakistan	Pathan	96	NA	0.00	45.00	Underhill et al. (2009)
South Asia	Pakistan	Sindhi	134	NA	0.00	49.00	Underhill et al. (2009)
Middle East	Turkey		89	NA	0.00	3.37	Underhill et al. (2009)
Caucasus	Armenia		25	NA	0.00	4.00	Underhill et al. (2009)
Caucasus	Russia	Megrels	67	NA	0.00	8.96	Underhill et al. (2009)
Caucasus	Russia	Abkhazes	162	NA	0.00	9.26	Underhill et al. (2009)
Caucasus	Russia	Avars	42	NA	0.00	2.38	Underhill et al. (2009)
Caucasus	Russia	Chamalals	27	NA	0.00	7.41	Underhill et al. (2009)
Caucasus	Russia	Bagvalals	28	NA	0.00	3.57	Underhill et al. (2009)
Caucasus	Russia	Andis	49	NA	0.00	2.04	Underhill et al. (2009)
Caucasus	Russia	Lezgis	31	NA	0.00	0.00	Underhill et al. (2009)
Caucasus	Russia	Darginians	68	NA	0.00	0.00	Underhill et al. (2009)
Caucasus	Russia	Tabasarans	43	NA	0.00	2.33	Underhill et al. (2009)
Caucasus	Russia	Adyghes	160	NA	0.00	11.25	Underhill et al. (2009)
Caucasus	Russia	Karachays	69	NA	0.00	27.54	Underhill et al. (2009)
Caucasus	Russia	Kumyks	76	NA	0.00	13.16	Underhill et al. (2009)
Caucasus	Russia	Balkars	136	NA	0.00	25.74	Underhill et al. (2009)
Caucasus	Russia	Cherkessians	126	NA	0.00	12.70	Underhill et al. (2009)
Caucasus	Russia	Kabardians	141	NA	0.71	13.48	Underhill et al. (2009)
Caucasus	Russia	Abazas	89	NA	0.00	19.10	Underhill et al. (2009)
Caucasus	Russia	Nogays	87	NA	0.00	12.64	Underhill et al. (2009)
Caucasus	Russia	Karanogays	77	NA	0.00	9.09	Underhill et al. (2009)
Caucasus	Russia	Tats	10	NA	0.00	0.00	Underhill et al. (2009)
Europe	Greece	Crete	193	NA	0.00	8.81	Underhill et al. (2009)
Middle East	Oman		121	NA	0.00	9.09	Underhill et al. (2009)
Middle East	Iran		150	NA	0.67	12.67	Underhill et al. (2009)
Middle East	United Arab Emirates		164	NA	0.00	7.32	Underhill et al. (2009)
Middle East	Turkey		523	NA	0.00	6.88	Underhill et al. (2009)
Europe	Lithuania	Aukštaičiai	106	45.3	NA	NA	Kasperaviciūte et al. (2005)
Europe	Lithuania	Žemaičiai	90	44.4	NA	NA	Kasperaviciūte et al. (2005)
Europe	Norway	North	377	27.1	NA	NA	Dupuy et al. (2005)
Europe	Norway	Middle	317	31.5	NA	NA	Dupuy et al. (2005)
Europe	Norway	West	301	24.3	NA	NA	Dupuy et al. (2005)
Europe	Norway	East	493	26.8	NA	NA	Dupuy et al. (2005)
Europe	Norway	Bergen	93	28	NA	NA	Dupuy et al. (2005)
Europe	Norway	Oslo	109	19.3	NA	NA	Dupuy et al. (2005)
Europe	Norway	South	76	13.2	NA	NA	Dupuy et al. (2005)
Europe	Spain/Portugal	large survey	1140	NA	0.00	1.2	Adams et al. (2008)
Europe	Greece	Greeks	92	NA	0.00	16.3	Battaglia et al. (2008)
Europe	Greece	Greek Macedonian	57	NA	1.80	10.5	Battaglia et al. (2008)
Europe	Albania		55	NA	0.00	9.1	Battaglia et al. (2008)
Europe	Bosnia	Serbs	81	NA	0.00	13.6	Battaglia et al. (2008)
Europe	Bosnia	Bosniacs	84	NA	0.00	15.5	Battaglia et al. (2008)
Europe	Bosnia	Croats	90	NA	0.00	12.2	Battaglia et al. (2008)
Europe	Croatia		89	NA	0.00	27.0	Battaglia et al. (2008)
Europe	Hungary		53	NA	0.00	56.6	Battaglia et al. (2008)
Europe	Czech Republic		75	NA	0.00	41.3	Battaglia et al. (2008)
Europe	Poland		99	NA	0.00	56.6	Battaglia et al. (2008)
Europe	Ukraine		92	NA	0.00	50.0	Battaglia et al. (2008)
Europe	Georgia		66	NA	0.00	10.6	Battaglia et al. (2008)
Europe	Russia	Balkars	38	NA	0.00	13.2	Battaglia et al. (2008)
Europe	Republic of Macedonia	Albanians	64	NA	0.00	1.6	Battaglia et al. (2008)
Europe	Croatia	Osijek	29	NA	0.00	37.9	Battaglia et al. (2008)
Europe	Slovenia	Slovenians	75	NA	0.00	38.70	Battaglia et al. (2008)
Europe	Italy	North East	67	NA	0.00	10.4	Battaglia et al. (2008)
Europe	-	Ashkenazi Cohen	76	NA	0.00	1.3	Behar et al. (2003)
Europe	-	Sephardi Cohen	69	NA	0.00	5.8	Behar et al. (2003)
Europe	-	Ashkenazi Levite	60	NA	0.00	51.7	Behar et al. (2003)
Europe	-	Sephardi Levite	31	NA	0.00	3.2	Behar et al. (2003)
Middle East	Israel	Ashkenazi	100	NA	0.00	4.0	Behar et al. (2003)
Middle East	Israel	Sephardi	63	NA	0.00	1.6	Behar et al. (2003)
Europe	Germany		88	NA	0.00	12.5	Behar et al. (2003)
Europe	Norway		83	NA	0.00	21.7	Behar et al. (2003)
Europe	Germany	Sorbs	112	NA	0.00	63.4	Behar et al. (2003)
Europe	Belarus		306	NA	0.33	51.0	Behar et al. (2003)
Europe	Spain	Basques	42	NA	NA	0.0	Capelli et al. (2003)
Europe	British Crown	Channel Islands	128	NA	NA	2.0	Capelli et al. (2003)
Europe	England	Chippenham	52	NA	NA	6.0	Capelli et al. (2003)
Europe	England	Cornwall	52	NA	NA	6.0	Capelli et al. (2003)
Europe	England	Dorchester	73	NA	NA	4.0	Capelli et al. (2003)
Europe	England	Faversham	55	NA	NA	2.0	Capelli et al. (2003)
Europe	England	Midhurst	80	NA	NA	1.0	Capelli et al. (2003)
Europe	England	Morpeth	95	NA	NA	2.0	Capelli et al. (2003)
Europe	England	Norfolk	121	NA	NA	2.0	Capelli et al. (2003)
Europe	England	Penrith	90	NA	NA	2.0	Capelli et al. (2003)
Europe	England	Southwell	70	NA	NA	4.0	Capelli et al. (2003)
Europe	England	Uttoxeter	84	NA	NA	0.0	Capelli et al. (2003)
Europe	England	York	46	NA	NA	2.0	Capelli et al. (2003)
Europe	Denmark/Germany	Denmark/Schleswig-Holstein	190	NA	NA	8.0	Capelli et al. (2003)
Europe	Ireland	Castlerea	43	NA	NA	0.0	Capelli et al. (2003)
Europe	British Crown	Isle of Man	62	NA	NA	8.0	Capelli et al. (2003)
Europe	Norway		201	NA	NA	12.0	Capelli et al. (2003)
Europe	Scotland	Orkney	121	NA	NA	7.0	Capelli et al. (2003)
Europe	Ireland	Rush, Dublin	76	NA	NA	1.0	Capelli et al. (2003)
Europe	Scotland	Durness	51	NA	NA	2.0	Capelli et al. (2003)
Europe	Scotland	Oban	42	NA	NA	2.0	Capelli et al. (2003)
Europe	Scotland	Pitlochry	41	NA	NA	0.0	Capelli et al. (2003)
Europe	Scotland	Stonehaven	44	NA	NA	5.0	Capelli et al. (2003)
Europe	Scotland	Western Isles	88	NA	NA	3.0	Capelli et al. (2003)
Europe	Scotland	Shetland	63	NA	NA	6.0	Capelli et al. (2003)
Europe	Wales	Haverfordwest	59	NA	NA	2.0	Capelli et al. (2003)
Europe	Wales	Llangefni	80	NA	NA	1.0	Capelli et al. (2003)
Europe	Wales	Llanidloes	57	NA	NA	4.0	Capelli et al. (2003)
Middle East	Turkey		523	NA	NA	6.9	Cinnioğlu et al. (2004)
Europe	Italy	Sicily	236	NA	NA	5.5	
Europe	Greece		77	NA	NA	15.6	Firasat et al. (2007)
South Asia	India	Charan (Gujarat)	42	NA	NA	36.0	
South Asia	India	Bharwad (Gujarat)	48	NA	NA	17.0	
South Asia	India	Siddi (Gujarat)	60	NA	NA	5.0	
South Asia	India	Siddi (Karnataka)	65	NA	NA	3.0	
South Asia	India	Medar (Karnataka)	56	NA	NA	39.0	
South Asia	India	Grama Vokkal	54	NA	NA	25.0	
South Asia	India	Korava	38	NA	NA	24.0	
South Asia	India	Kare Vokkal	30	NA	NA	27.0	
South Asia	India	Pardhan (Dravidian tribe)	128	NA	NA	12.5	
South Asia	India	Andh (Dravidian tribe)	54	NA	NA	31.5	
South Asia	India	Naikpod (Andhra Pradesh)	68	NA	NA	19.11	
South Asia	India	Kota	62	NA	NA	22.58	
South Asia	India	Konar	107	NA	NA	14.95	
South Asia	India	Maravar	80	NA	NA	16.25	
South Asia	India	Valayar	95	NA	NA	20.0	
South Asia	India	Tamil Jains	100	NA	NA	18.0	
South Asia	India	Ezhava	95	NA	NA	24.21	
South Asia	India	Sourashtra	40	NA	NA	40.0	
South Asia	India	Vadama Iyer	63	NA	NA	47.62	
South Asia	Pakistan	Burusho	97	NA	NA	25.8	Firasat et al. (2007)
South Asia	Pakistan	Kalash	44	NA	NA	18.2	Firasat et al. (2007)
South Asia	Pakistan	Pathan (Pashtun)	96	NA	NA	44.8	Firasat et al. (2007)
South Asia	Pakistan		638	NA	NA	37.1	Firasat et al. (2007)
South Asia	Nepal	Tharu (central Terai)	57	NA	0.00	10.5	Fornarino et al. (2009)
South Asia	Nepal	Tharu (central Terai)	77	NA	0.00	3.9	Fornarino et al. (2009)
South Asia	Nepal	Tharu (Chitwan)	37	NA	0.00	16.2	Fornarino et al. (2009)
South Asia	Nepal	Hindus (proxy for Indian ancestry) Chitwan, Nepal	26	NA	0.00	69.2	Fornarino et al. (2009)
South Asia	India	Hindu (New Delhi)	49	NA	0.00	34.7	Fornarino et al. (2009)
South Asia	India	Andhra Pradesh tribal	29	NA	0.00	27.6	Fornarino et al. (2009)
Europe	Poland		913	NA	NA	57.0	Kayser et al. (2005)
Europe	Germany		1215	NA	NA	17.9	Kayser et al. (2005)
Europe	Germany	Berlin	103	NA	NA	22.3	Kayser et al. (2005)
Europe	Germany	Leipzig	144	NA	NA	27.1	Kayser et al. (2005)
Europe	Germany	Magdeburg	100	NA	NA	21	Kayser et al. (2005)
Europe	Germany	Rostock	96	NA	NA	31.3	Kayser et al. (2005)
Europe	Germany	Greifswald	104	NA	NA	19.2	Kayser et al. (2005)
Europe	Germany	Hamburg	161	NA	NA	16.8	Kayser et al. (2005)
Europe	Germany	Münster	102	NA	NA	7.8	Kayser et al. (2005)
Europe	Germany	Freiburg	102	NA	NA	10.8	Kayser et al. (2005)
Europe	Germany	Cologne	96	NA	NA	15.6	Kayser et al. (2005)
Europe	Germany	Mainz	95	NA	NA	8.4	Kayser et al. (2005)
Europe	Germany	Munich	95	NA	NA	14.3	Kayser et al. (2005)
Europe	Greece	Nea Nikomedeia	57	NA	0.00	21.1	King et al. (2008)
Europe	Greece	Sesklo/Dimini	57	NA	0.00	10.5	King et al. (2008)
Europe	Greece	Lerna/Franchthi	57	NA	0.00	1.8	King et al. (2008)
Europe	Greece	Crete	193	NA	0.50	8.3	King et al. (2008)
Europe	Greece	Crete, Heraklion Prefecture	104	NA	0.00	8.7	
Europe	Greece	Crete, Lasithi Plateau	41	NA	0.00	19.5	
Europe	Greece	Crete, Lasithi Prefecture	23	NA	0.00	4.3	
Europe	Ukraine		94	NA	NA	43.6	Kharkov et al. (2004)
Europe	Belarus		68	NA	NA	45.6	Kharkov et al. (2005)
North Asia	Russia (Altai Republic)	Northern Altaians (Gorno-Altaisk)	20	NA	NA	50.0	Kharkov et al. (2007)
North Asia	Russia (Altai Republic)	Northern Altaians (Kurmach-Baigol)	11	NA	NA	18.2	Kharkov et al. (2007)
North Asia	Russia (Altai Republic)	Northern Altaians (Turochak)	19	NA	NA	36.8	Kharkov et al. (2007)
North Asia	Russia (Altai Republic)	Southern Altaians (Beshpel'tir)	43	NA	NA	58.1	Kharkov et al. (2007)
North Asia	Russia (Altai Republic)	Southern Altaians (Kulada)	46	NA	NA	52.2	Kharkov et al. (2007)
North Asia	Russia (Altai Republic)	Southern Altaians (Kosh-Agach)	7	NA	NA	28.6	Kharkov et al. (2007)
Europe	England	West Lancashire (2 gens)	49	NA	NA	2.0	Bowden et al. (2008)
Europe	England	Wirral (2 gens)	100	NA	NA	4.0	Bowden et al. (2008)
Europe	England	West Lancashire (medieval?)	42	NA	NA	16.7	Bowden et al. (2008)
Europe	England	Wirral (medieval?)	37	NA	NA	13.5	Bowden et al. (2008)
South Asia	India	Chenchu	41	NA	NA	26.8	Kivisild et al. (2003)
South Asia	India	Koya	41	NA	NA	2.4	Kivisild et al. (2003)
South Asia	India	West Bengal	31	NA	NA	38.7	Kivisild et al. (2003)
South Asia	India	Chipavan Brahmin (Bombay)	43	NA	NA	41.9	Kivisild et al. (2003)
South Asia	India	Gujarat	29	NA	NA	24.1	Kivisild et al. (2003)
South Asia	India	Lambadi	35	NA	NA	8.6	Kivisild et al. (2003)
South Asia	India	Punjab	66	NA	NA	47.0	Kivisild et al. (2003)
South Asia	Sri Lanka	Sinhalese	87	23.0	NA	NA	Kivisild (2003)a
North Asia	Russia	Tuvan	40	NA	NA	7.5	Lell et al. (2002)
North Asia	Russia	Tofalar	19	NA	NA	5.3	Lell et al. (2002)
North Asia	Russia	Buryat	13	NA	NA	0.0	Lell et al. (2002)
North Asia	Russia	Yenisey Evenk	31	NA	NA	9.7	Lell et al. (2002)
North Asia	Russia	Okhotsk Evenk	16	NA	NA	0.0	Lell et al. (2002)
North Asia	Russia	Ulchi/Nanai	53	NA	NA	0.0	Lell et al. (2002)
North Asia	Russia	Upriver Negidal	10	NA	NA	0.0	Lell et al. (2002)
North Asia	Russia	Downriver Negidal	7	NA	NA	0.0	Lell et al. (2002)
North Asia	Russia	Ugedey	20	NA	NA	5.0	Lell et al. (2002)
North Asia	Russia	Nivkh	17	NA	NA	0.0	Lell et al. (2002)
North Asia	Russia	Kamchatka, Koryak	27	NA	NA	0.0	Lell et al. (2002)
North Asia	Russia	Kamchatka, Itel\'man	18	NA	NA	22.2	Lell et al. (2002)
North Asia	Russia	Chukotka, Chukchi	24	NA	NA	4.2	Lell et al. (2002)
North Asia	Russia	Chukotka, Asiatic Eskimo	33	NA	NA	0.0	Lell et al. (2002)
Caucasus	Russia	Abazinians	14	NA	NA	14.0	Nasidze et al. (2004)
Caucasus	Russia	Chechenians	19	NA	NA	5.0	Nasidze et al. (2004)
Caucasus	Russia	Darginians	26	NA	NA	0.0	Nasidze et al. (2004)
Caucasus	Russia	Ingushians	22	NA	NA	0.0	Nasidze et al. (2004)
Caucasus	Russia	Kabardinians	59	NA	NA	2.0	Nasidze et al. (2004)
Caucasus	Russia	Lezgi (Dagestan)	25	NA	NA	0.0	Nasidze et al. (2004)
Caucasus	Russia	Ossetians (Ardon)	28	NA	NA	4.0	Nasidze et al. (2004)
Caucasus	Russia	Ossetians (Digora)	31	NA	NA	0.0	Nasidze et al. (2004)
Caucasus	Russia	Rutulians	24	NA	NA	0.0	Nasidze et al. (2004)
Caucasus	Georgia	Abkhazians	12	NA	NA	33.0	Nasidze et al. (2004)
Caucasus	Armenia	Armenians	100	NA	NA	6.0	Nasidze et al. (2004)
Caucasus	Azerbaijan	Azerbaijanians	72	NA	NA	7.0	Nasidze et al. (2004)
Caucasus	Georgia	Georgians	77	NA	NA	10.0	Nasidze et al. (2004)
Middle East	Turkey		39	NA	NA	13.0	Nasidze et al. (2004)
Middle East	Iran	Isfahan	50	NA	NA	18.0	Nasidze et al. (2004)
Middle East	Iran	Tehran	80	NA	NA	20.0	Nasidze et al. (2004)
South Asia	Pakistan	Balti	13	NA	NA	46.15	Qamar et al. (2002)
South Asia	Pakistan	Brahui	110	NA	NA	39.09	Qamar et al. (2002)
South Asia	Pakistan	Burusho	94	NA	NA	27.67	Qamar et al. (2002)
South Asia	Pakistan	Kalash	44	NA	NA	18.18	Qamar et al. (2002)
South Asia	Pakistan	Kashmiri	12	NA	NA	58.33	Qamar et al. (2002)
South Asia	Pakistan	Baloch (Makran)	25	NA	NA	28.00	Qamar et al. (2002)
South Asia	Pakistan	Siddi (Makran)	33	NA	NA	30.30	Qamar et al. (2002)
South Asia	Pakistan	Parsi	90	NA	NA	7.77	Qamar et al. (2002)
South Asia	Pakistan	Pathan	93	NA	NA	45.16	Qamar et al. (2002)
South Asia	Pakistan	Sindhi	122	NA	NA	49.18	Qamar et al. (2002)
Europe	Albania	Albanian	51	NA	NA	9.8	Semino et al. (2000)
Europe	France	French Basque	22	NA	NA	0.0	Semino et al. (2000)
Europe	Spain	Spanish Basque	45	NA	NA	0.0	Semino et al. (2000)
Europe	Italy	Calabrian	37	NA	NA	0.0	Semino et al. (2000)
Europe	Spain	Catalan	24	NA	NA	0.0	Semino et al. (2000)
Europe	Italy	Central/Northern	50	NA	NA	4.0	Semino et al. (2000)
Europe	Croatia	Croatian	58	NA	NA	29.3	Semino et al. (2000)
Europe	Czech Republic/Slovakia	Czech/Slovak	45	NA	NA	26.7	Semino et al. (2000)
Europe	Netherlands	Dutch	27	NA	NA	3.7	Semino et al. (2000)
Europe	Georgia	Georgian	63	NA	NA	7.9	Semino et al. (2000)
Europe	Germany	German	16	NA	NA	6.2	Semino et al. (2000)
Europe	Greece	Greek	76	NA	NA	11.8	Semino et al. (2000)
Europe	Hungary	Hungarian	45	NA	NA	60.0	Semino et al. (2000)
Middle East	Lebanon	Lebanese	31	NA	NA	9.7	Semino et al. (2000)
Europe	Greece	Greek Macedonian	20	NA	NA	35.0	Semino et al. (2000)
Europe	Poland	Polish	55	NA	NA	56.4	Semino et al. (2000)
Europe		Saami	24	NA	NA	8.3	Semino et al. (2000)
Europe	Italy	Sardinian	1204	NA	NA	1.3	Francalacci et al. (2013)
Europe	Syria	Syrian	20	NA	NA	10.0	Semino et al. (2000)
Europe	Turkey	Turkish	30	NA	NA	6.6	Semino et al. (2000)
Asia	Russia	Udmurt	43	NA	NA	37.2	Semino et al. (2000)
Europe	Ukraine	Ukrainian	50	NA	NA	54.0	Semino et al. (2000)
South Asia	Pakistan		85	NA	NA	16.5	Sengupta et al. (2005)
South Asia	India	Rajput (Rajasthan)	29	NA	NA	31.3	Sengupta et al. (2005)
South Asia	India	Pallar	29	NA	NA	24.14	Sengupta et al. (2005)
South Asia	Pakistan	Southern	91	NA	NA	31.9	Sengupta et al. (2005)
Southeast Asia	Cambodia		6	NA	NA	0.0	Sengupta et al. (2005)
East Asia	China		128	NA	NA	0.0	Sengupta et al. (2005)
East Asia	Japan		23	NA	NA	0.0	Sengupta et al. (2005)
North Asia	Siberia		18	NA	NA	0.0	Sengupta et al. (2005)
South Asia	India	Tribe (Austro-Asiatic)	64	NA	NA	0.0	Sengupta et al. (2005)
South Asia	India	Tribe (Dravidian)	18	NA	NA	2.8	Sengupta et al. (2005)
South Asia	India	Tribe (Tibeto-Burman)	87	NA	NA	4.6	Sengupta et al. (2005)
South Asia	India	Tribe (Indo-European)	21	NA	NA	19.1	Sengupta et al. (2005)
South Asia	India	Iyer/Iyengar (Tamil Nadu)	59	NA	NA	28.8	Sengupta et al. (2005)
South Asia	India	Dravidian middle caste	85	NA	NA	11.8	Sengupta et al. (2005)
South Asia	India	Pallar	29	NA	NA	24.1	Sengupta et al. (2005)
South Asia	India	Indo-European Upper Caste	86	NA	NA	45.4	Sengupta et al. (2005)
South Asia	India	Indo-European Middle Caste	48	NA	NA	50.4	Sengupta et al. (2005)
South Asia	India	Indo-European low caste	50	NA	NA	26.0	Sengupta et al. (2005)
South Asia	India	Kashmiri Gujars	49	NA	0.00	40.86	Sharma et al. (2009)
South Asia	India	Kashmiri Pandits	51	NA	3.92	19.61	Sharma et al. (2009)
South Asia	India	Brahmin (Gujarat)	64	NA	0.00	32.81	Sharma et al. (2009)
South Asia	India	Paswan	27	NA	0.00	40.74	Sharma et al. (2009)
South Asia	India	Brahmin (Bihar)	38	NA	0.00	60.53	Sharma et al. (2009)
South Asia	India	Himachal Pradesh Brahmin	30	NA	0.00	47.37	Sharma et al. (2009)
South Asia	India	Punjab Brahmin	49	NA	0.00	35.71	Sharma et al. (2009)
South Asia	India	Brahmin (West Bengal)	30	NA	0.00	72.22	Sharma et al. (2009)
South Asia	India	Brahmin (Uttar Pradesh)	31	NA	0.00	67.74	Sharma et al. (2009)
South Asia	India	Kol (Uttar Pradesh)	38	NA	0.00	14.81	Sharma et al. (2009)
South Asia	India	Saharia	57	NA	22.8	28.07	Sharma et al. (2009)
South Asia	India	Brahmin (Madhya Pradesh)	42	NA	0.00	38.1	Sharma et al. (2009)
South Asia	India	Brahmin (Maharashtra)	32	NA	0.00	43.33	Sharma et al. (2009)
Europe	Moldova	Moldavians, Carahasani	72	NA	NA	34.7	Varzari (2006)
Europe	Moldava	Moldavians Sofia, Moldava	54	NA	NA	20.4	Varzari (2006)
Europe	Romania	Dniester-Carpathian	-	NA	NA	20.4	Varzari (2006)
Europe	Ukraine	Ukrainians, Rashkovo	53	NA	NA	41.5	Varzari (2006)
Europe	Moldava	Gagauzes, Kongaz	48	NA	NA	12.5	Varzari (2006)
Europe	Ukraine	Gagauzes, Etulia	41	NA	NA	26.8	Varzari (2006)
East Asia	China	Dongxiang	49	NA	0?	28.0	Wang et al. (2003)
East Asia	China	Salar	52	NA	0?	17.0	Wang et al. (2003)
East Asia	China	Bo\'an (Bonan) Mongolian descent	47	NA	0?	26.0	Wang et al. (2003)
Caucasus	Armenia	Ararat	44	NA	0.00	0.0	Weale et al. (2001)
Caucasus	Armenia/Georgia	\"Northern Armenians\"	189	NA	0.53	4.2	Weale et al. (2001)
Caucasus	Armenia	Syunik (South Armenia)	140	NA	0.00	9.3	Weale et al. (2001)
Caucasus	Azerbaijan/Armenia	Karabakh	215	NA	0.00	5.6	Weale et al. (2001)
Middle East	Iran	Isfahan, New Julfa, (Armenian descent)	56	NA	0.00	1.8	Weale et al. (2001)
Middle East	Turkey	near Armenia	90	NA	1.11	3.3	Weale et al. (2001)
Middle East	Turkey	Istanbul University	173	NA	0.00	10.4	Weale et al. (2001)
Caucasus	Azerbaijan	Baku	29	NA	0.00	10.3	Weale et al. (2001)
Middle East	Syria	Damascus University	44	NA	0.00	2.3	Weale et al. (2001)
Caucasus	Georgia	Tbilisi	68	NA	0.00	4.4	Weale et al. (2001)
Europe	Greece	Athens	132	NA	0.00	6.1	Weale et al. (2001)
Europe	Mongolia	soldiers mainly from Khalkh	402	NA	0.00	2.5	Weale et al. (2001)
Europe	Hungary		215	NA	1.40	24.2	Völgyi et al. (2008)
Europe	Wales	North Wales	98	NA	NA	1.0	Weale et al. (2002)
Europe	England	English Midlands	136	NA	NA	4.4	Weale et al. (2002)
Europe	England	East Anglia	173	NA	NA	4.6	Weale et al. (2002)
Europe	Netherlands	Friesland	94	NA	NA	7.4	Weale et al. (2002)
Europe	Norway		83	NA	NA	21.7	Weale et al. (2002)
Europe	England/Scotland/Wales?	British	25	NA	NA	0.0	Wells et al. (2001)
Europe	Scotland	Orkney	26	NA	NA	27.0	Wells et al. (2001)
Europe	Russia	Pomor	28	NA	NA	36.0	Wells et al. (2001)
Europe	Russia	Russian, North	49	NA	NA	43.0	Wells et al. (2001)
Asia	Russia	Russian, Tashkent	89	NA	NA	47.0	Wells et al. (2001)
Europe	Russia	Kazan Tatar	38	NA	NA	24.0	Wells et al. (2001)
Europe	Russia	Saami	23	NA	NA	22.0	Wells et al. (2001)
Asia	Russia	Nenets	54	NA	NA	11.0	Wells et al. (2001)
Middle East	Lebanon		50	NA	NA	0.0	Wells et al. (2001)
Middle East	Iran	Tehran	24	NA	NA	4.0	Wells et al. (2001)
Middle East	Iran	Shiraz	12	NA	NA	0.0	Wells et al. (2001)
Middle East	Iran	Esfahan	16	NA	NA	0.0	Wells et al. (2001)
Caucasus	Georgia	Svans (Svanetians)	25	NA	NA	8.0	Wells et al. (2001)
Caucasus	Georgia	Kazbegi	25	NA	NA	4.0	Wells et al. (2001)
Caucasus	Georgia	South Ossetians	17	NA	NA	6.0	Wells et al. (2001)
Caucasus	Azerbaijan	Lezgi in Azerbaijan	12	NA	NA	8.0	Wells et al. (2001)
Caucasus	Azerbaijan	Azerbaijanians	21	NA	NA	10.0	Wells et al. (2001)
Caucasus	Armenia	Armenians	47	NA	NA	9.0	Wells et al. (2001)
Central Asia	Afghanistan	Pashtuns	49	NA	NA	51.02	
Central Asia	Afghanistan	Tajiks	56	NA	NA	30.36	
Central Asia	Afghanistan	Hazara	60	NA	NA	6.66	
Central Asia	Afghanistan	Uzbeks	17	NA	NA	17.64	
Central Asia	Afghanistan	Balochs	13	NA	NA	0.0	
Central Asia	Afghanistan	Nuristanis	5	NA	NA	60.0	
Central Asia	Turkmenistan	Turkmen	30	NA	NA	7.0	Wells et al. (2001)
Central Asia	Turkmenistan	Turkmenistan Kurd	17	NA	NA	12.0	Wells et al. (2001)
Central Asia	Uzbekistan	Sinte Romani	15	NA	NA	0.0	Wells et al. (2001)
Central Asia	Uzbekistan	Iranian (Samarkand)	53	NA	NA	11.0	Wells et al. (2001)
Central Asia	Uzbekistan	Tajik (Samarkand)	40	NA	NA	25.0	Wells et al. (2001)
Central Asia	Uzbekistan	Arab Bukhara	42	NA	NA	19.0	Wells et al. (2001)
Central Asia	Uzbekistan	Crimean Tatar	22	NA	NA	32.0	Wells et al. (2001)
Central Asia	Uzbekistan	Karakalpak	44	NA	NA	18.0	Wells et al. (2001)
Central Asia	Uzbekistan	Uzbek/ Kashkadarya	19	NA	NA	16.0	Wells et al. (2001)
Central Asia	Uzbekistan	Uzbek/ Bukhara	58	NA	NA	28.0	Wells et al. (2001)
Central Asia	Uzbekistan	Uzbek/ Surkhandarya	68	NA	NA	29.0	Wells et al. (2001)
Central Asia	Uzbekistan	Uzbek/ Khorezm	70	NA	NA	30.0	Wells et al. (2001)
Central Asia	Uzbekistan	Uzbek/ Tashkent	43	NA	NA	28.0	Wells et al. (2001)
Central Asia	Uzbekistan	Uzbek/ Fergana Valley	63	NA	NA	22.0	Wells et al. (2001)
Central Asia	Uzbekistan	Samarkand	45	NA	NA	13.0	Wells et al. (2001)
Central Asia	Tajikistan	Ishkashimi (near Afghanistan)	25	NA	NA	68.0	Wells et al. (2001)
Central Asia	Tajikistan	Bartangi	30	NA	NA	40.0	Wells et al. (2001)
Central Asia	Tajikistan	Shugnan	44	NA	NA	23.0	Wells et al. (2001)
Central Asia	Tajikistan	Yagnobi	31	NA	NA	16.0	Wells et al. (2001)
Central Asia	Tajikistan	Tajiks/Panjikent	22	NA	NA	64.0	Wells et al. (2001)
Central Asia	Tajikistan	Tajiks/Dushanbe	16	NA	NA	19.0	Wells et al. (2001)
Central Asia	Kyrgyzstan	Kyrgyz	52	NA	NA	63.0	Wells et al. (2001)
Central Asia	Kyrgyzstan	Dungan (Sino-Tibetan)	40	NA	NA	10.0	Wells et al. (2001)
Central Asia	Kazakhstan	Kazakhs	54	NA	NA	4.0	Wells et al. (2001)
Central Asia	Kazakhstan	Uighur	41	NA	NA	22.0	Wells et al. (2001)
South Asia	India	Saurashtra	46	NA	NA	39.0	Wells et al. (2001)
South Asia	India	Kallar	84	NA	NA	4.0	Wells et al. (2001)
South Asia	India	Konar	129	NA	NA	13.0	Wells et al. (2001)
North Asia	Russia	Tuvinian	42	NA	NA	14.0	Wells et al. (2001)
North Asia	Mongolia		24	NA	NA	4.0	Wells et al. (2001)
East Asia	Korea		45	NA	NA	0.0	Wells et al. (2001)
East Asia	China	Liqian from Yongchang	87	NA	NA	1.1	Zhou et al. (2007)
East Asia	China	Yugur from Su\'nan	52	NA	NA	1.9	Zhou et al. (2007)
East Asia	China	Tibetan from Guide, Qinghai	39	NA	NA	2.6	Zhou et al. (2007)
East Asia	China	Uygurs from Urumqi	49	NA	NA	NA	Zhou et al. (2007)
Europe	Italy	Sardinia	10	0.0	NA	NA	Rosser et al. (2000)
Europe	England	Cornwall	51	0.0	NA	NA	Rosser et al. (2000)
Europe	Spain	Basque	26	0.0	NA	NA	Rosser et al. (2000)
Europe	Portugal	Northern	328	0.0	NA	NA	Rosser et al. (2000)
North Africa	Algeria		27	0.0	NA	NA	Rosser et al. (2000)
North Africa			129	0.0	NA	NA	Rosser et al. (2000)
North Africa	Tunisia	Jerbian Arabs	46	NA	4.3	4.3	Ennafaa et al. (2011)
Europe	Finland		57	10.0	NA	NA	Rosser et al. (2000)
Europe	Bulgaria		24	12.0	NA	NA	Rosser et al. (2000)
Europe	Netherlands		84	13.0	NA	NA	Rosser et al. (2000)
Europe	Germany	Bavarian	80	15.0	NA	NA	Rosser et al. (2000)
Europe	Sweden	Gotlander	64	16.0	NA	NA	Rosser et al. (2000)
Europe		Yugoslavian	100	16.0	NA	NA	Rosser et al. (2000)
Europe	Russia	Chuvash	17	18.0	NA	NA	Rosser et al. (2000)
Europe	Sweden	Northern	48	19.0	NA	NA	Rosser et al. (2000)
Europe	Romania		45	20.0	NA	NA	Rosser et al. (2000)
Europe	Iceland		28	21.0	NA	NA	Rosser et al. (2000)
Europe		Saami	48	21.0	NA	NA	Rosser et al. (2000)
Europe	Hungary		36	22.0	NA	NA	Rosser et al. (2000)
Europe	Estonia		207	27.0	NA	NA	Rosser et al. (2000)
Europe	Russia	Mari	48	29.0 (Tambets disagrees)	NA	NA	Rosser et al. (2000)
Europe	Ukraine	Ukraine	27	30.0	NA	NA	Rosser et al. (2000)
Europe	Germany		30	30.0	NA	NA	Rosser et al. (2000)
Europe	Norway		52	31.0	NA	NA	Rosser et al. (2000)
Europe	Lithuania		38	34.0	NA	NA	Rosser et al. (2000)
Europe	Slovenia		70	37.0	NA	NA	Rosser et al. (2000)
Europe	Czech Republic		53	38.0	NA	NA	Rosser et al. (2000)
Europe	Belarus		41	39.0	NA	NA	Rosser et al. (2000)
Europe	Latvia		34	41.0	NA	NA	Rosser et al. (2000)
Asia	Russia		122	47.0	NA	NA	Rosser et al. (2000)
Europe	Slovakia		70	47.0	NA	NA	Rosser et al. (2000)
Europe	Poland		112	54.0	NA	NA	Rosser et al. (2000)
Europe	Ireland		57	1.0	NA	NA	Rosser et al. (2000)
Europe	Ossetia		47	2.0	NA	NA	Rosser et al. (2000)
Europe	Cyprus		45	2.0	NA	NA	Rosser et al. (2000)
Europe	Italy		99	2.0	NA	NA	Rosser et al. (2000)
Europe	Spain		126	2.0	NA	NA	Rosser et al. (2000)
Europe	Portugal	Southern	57	2.0	NA	NA	Rosser et al. (2000)
Europe	Belgium		92	4.0	NA	NA	Rosser et al. (2000)
Middle East	Turkey		167	5.0	NA	NA	Rosser et al. (2000)
Europe	France		40	5.0	NA	NA	Rosser et al. (2000)
Europe	Georgia		64	6.0	NA	NA	Rosser et al. (2000)
Europe	Armenia		89	6.0	NA	NA	Rosser et al. (2000)
Europe	Denmark		56	7.0	NA	NA	Rosser et al. (2000)
Europe	Scotland	Western	120	7.0	NA	NA	Rosser et al. (2000)
Europe	Scotland		43	7.0	NA	NA	Rosser et al. (2000)
Europe	Greece		36	8.0	NA	NA	Rosser et al. (2000)
Europe	England	East Anglia	172	9.0	NA	NA	Rosser et al. (2000)
Europe	Iceland		181	23.8	NA	NA	Helgason et al. (2000)
Europe	Norway		112	17.9	NA	NA	Helgason et al. (2000)
Europe	Sweden		110	17.3	NA	NA	Helgason et al. (2000)
Europe	Denmark		12	16.7	NA	NA	Helgason et al. (2000)
Europe	Ireland		222	0.5	NA	NA	Helgason et al. (2000)
Europe	Scotland		61	6.6	NA	NA	Helgason et al. (2000)
Europe	Britain		32	9.4	NA	NA	Helgason et al. (2000)
Europe	Germany		32	9.4	NA	NA	Helgason et al. (2000)
Europe	Greece		42	4.8	NA	NA	Helgason et al. (2000)
Europe	Italy		332	2.7	NA	NA	Helgason et al. (2000)
Asia	Russia		30	43.3	NA	NA	Helgason et al. (2000)
Europe	Bulgaria	Bulgarian	808	17.5	NA	NA	
Europe	Croatia	Mainland	108	34.3	NA	NA	Pericic et al. (2005)
Europe	Bosnia-Herzogivina	Bosnians	69	24.6	NA	NA	Pericic et al. (2005)
Europe	Bosnia-Herzogivina	Herzogivinians	141	12.1	NA	NA	Pericic et al. (2005)
Europe	Serbia	Serbians	113	15.9	NA	NA	Pericic et al. (2005)
Europe	Kosova	Albanians	114	4.4	NA	NA	Pericic et al. (2005)
Europe	Republic of Macedonia	Macedonians	79	15.2	NA	NA	Pericic et al. (2005)
Europe	Republic of Macedonia	Romani	57	1.8	NA	NA	Pericic et al. (2005)
Europe	Croatia	Mainland	109	33.9	NA	NA	Barać et al. (2003)
Europe	Croatia	Krk	74	28.0	NA	NA	Barać et al. (2003)
Europe	Croatia	Brač	49	13.0	NA	NA	Barać et al. (2003)
Europe	Croatia	Hvar	91	8.0	NA	NA	Barać et al. (2003)
Europe	Croatia	Korčula	134	27.0	NA	NA	Barać et al. (2003)
Europe	Russia	North	380	34.20	NA	NA	Balanovsky et al. (2008)
Europe	Russia	Central	364	46.50	NA	NA	Balanovsky et al. (2008)
Europe	Russia	South	484	55.40	NA	NA	Balanovsky et al. (2008)
Europe	Portugal		553	1.27	NA	NA	
Europe	Sweden	Swedes	141	18.4	NA	NA	Tambets et al. (2004)
Europe	Estonia	Estonians	209	33.5	NA	NA	Tambets et al. (2004)
Europe	Latvia	Latvians	86	38.4	NA	NA	Tambets et al. (2004)
Europe	Russia	Mari	111	47.7 (Rosser disagrees)	NA	NA	Tambets et al. (2004)
Europe	Russia	Mordvin	83	26.5	NA	NA	Tambets et al. (2004)
Europe	Russia	Komi	94	33	NA	NA	Tambets et al. (2004)
Europe	Russia	Udmurt	87	10.3	NA	NA	Tambets et al. (2004)
Europe	Russia	Chuvash	79	31.6	NA	NA	Tambets et al. (2004)
Europe	Russia	Volga Tatars	126	34.1	NA	NA	Tambets et al. (2004)
Europe	France	French	61	0	NA	NA	Tambets et al. (2004)
Europe	Hungary	Hungarians	113	20.4	NA	NA	Tambets et al. (2004)
Europe	Russia	Russians	61	42.6	NA	NA	Tambets et al. (2004)
North Asia	Russia	Khant	47	4.3	NA	NA	Tambets et al. (2004)
North Asia	Russia	Nganasan	38	0	NA	NA	Tambets et al. (2004)
North Asia	Russia	Nenets	148	0	NA	NA	Tambets et al. (2004)
North Asia	Russia	Selkup	131	19.1	NA	NA	Tambets et al. (2004)
North Asia	Russia	Ket	48	0	NA	NA	Tambets et al. (2004)
North Asia	Russia	Dolgan	67	16.4	NA	NA	Tambets et al. (2004)
North Asia	Russia	Yakut	155	1.9	NA	NA	Tambets et al. (2004)
North Asia	Russia	Buryat	81	1.2	NA	NA	Tambets et al. (2004)
North Asia	Russia	Evenk	96	1	NA	NA	Tambets et al. (2004)
North Asia	Russia	Evens	31	6.5	NA	NA	Tambets et al. (2004)
North Asia	Russia	Altaians	98	46.9	NA	NA	Tambets et al. (2004)
Europe	Norway	Norwegians	72	23.6	NA	NA	Passarino et al. (2002)
Europe	Denmark	Danes	194	16.5	NA	NA	Sanchez et al. (2003)
Middle East	Turkey	Kurds Zazaki speakers	27	NA	NA	25.9	Nasidze et al. (2005)
Middle East	Turkey	Kurds Kurmanji speakers	87	NA	NA	12.7	Nasidze et al. (2005)
Middle East	Iraq	Kurds	95	NA	NA	11.6	
Caucasus	Georgia	Kurds	25	NA	NA	0.0	Nasidze et al. (2005)
Middle East	Jordan	Amman	101	NA	NA	2.0	
Middle East	Jordan	Dead Sea	45	NA	NA	0.0	
Middle East	Iraq	Baghdad, different ethnic groups	139	NA	NA	6.5	Al Zahery et al. (2003)
Europe	Russia	Arkhangelsk	28	NA	0.00	17.9	Mirabal et al. (2009)
North Asia	Russia	Khanty	27	NA	0.00	14.8	Mirabal et al. (2009)
Europe	Russia	Izhenski Komi	54	NA	0.00	29.6	Mirabal et al. (2009)
Europe	Russia	Priluzki Komi	49	NA	0.00	32.7	Mirabal et al. (2009)
Europe	Russia	Kursk region Russian	40	NA	0.00	52.5	Mirabal et al. (2009)
Europe	Russia	Tver region Russian	38	NA	0.00	57.9	Mirabal et al. (2009)
