= Minino, Cherepovetsky District, Vologda Oblast =

Minino Минино
- Village
- Location within Vologda Oblast Location within Russia
- Coordinates: 59°00′N 38°22′E
- Country: Russia
- Region: Vologda Oblast
- District: Cherepovetsky District
- Time zone: UTC+3:00

Minino (Russian: Минино) is a rural locality (a village) in Yugskoye Rural Settlement, Cherepovetsky District, Vologda Oblast, Russia. The population was 16 as of 2002.

== Geography ==
Minino is located 40 km (25 mi) southeast of Cherepovets (the district's administrative centre) by road. Dmitriyevskoye is the nearest rural locality.
