= Peschanitsa =

Peschanitsa Песчаница
- Village
- Location within Arkhangelsk Oblast Location within Russia
- Coordinates: 61°07′N 46°38′E
- Country: Russia
- Region: Arkhangelsk Oblast
- District: Kotlassky District
- Time zone: UTC+3:00

Peschanitsa (Russian: Песчаница) is a rural locality (a village) in Cheryomushskoye Rural Settlement of Kotlassky District, Arkhangelsk Oblast, Russia. The population was 12 as of 2010.

== Geography ==
Peschanitsa is located 18 km south of Kotlas (the district's administrative centre) by road. Kotelnikovo is the nearest rural locality.
