= Minino =

Minino Минино
- Village
- Location within Perm Krai Location within Russia
- Coordinates: 58°03′N 54°14′E
- Country: Russia
- Region: Perm Krai
- District: Vereshchaginsky District
- Time zone: UTC+5:00

Minino (Russian: Минино) is a rural locality (a village) in Vereshchaginsky District, Perm Krai, Russia. The population was 19 as of 2010.

== Geography ==
Minino is located 30 km west of Vereshchagino (the district's administrative centre) by road. Lukino is the nearest rural locality.
