= Khanevo =

Khanevo Ханево
- Village
- Location within Vologda Oblast Location within Russia
- Coordinates: 59°02′N 38°30′E
- Country: Russia
- Region: Vologda Oblast
- District: Sheksninsky District
- Time zone: UTC+3:00

Khanevo (Russian: Ханево) is a rural locality (a village) in Yurochenskoye Rural Settlement, Sheksninsky District, Vologda Oblast, Russia. The population was 8 as of 2002.

== Geography ==
Khanevo is located 34 km south of Sheksna (the district's administrative centre) by road. Yurochkino is the nearest rural locality.
