= Genographics =

Genographics may refer to a number of things:

- PC-GenoGraphics, a visual database/query facility designed for reasoning with genomic data
- GenoGraphics, a generic utility for constructing and querying one-dimensional linear plots
- The Genographic Project
- Genetic genealogy gone global
