= Wilfred Griggs =

Wilfred Griggs may refer to:

- C. Wilfred Griggs, professor of ancient scripture
- Wilfred E. Griggs, American architect
