= Introduction to genetics =

Non-technical introduction to genetics

Genetics is the study of genes and tries to explain what they are and how they work. Genes are how living organisms inherit features or traits from their ancestors; for example, children usually look like their parents because they have inherited their parents' genes. Genetics tries to identify which traits are inherited and to explain how these traits are passed from generation to generation.

Some traits are part of an organism's physical appearance, such as eye color or height. Other sorts of traits are not easily seen and include blood types or resistance to diseases. Some traits are inherited through genes, which is the reason why tall and thin people tend to have tall and thin children. Other traits come from interactions between genes and the environment, so a child who inherited the tendency of being tall will still be short if poorly nourished. The way the genes and environment interact to produce a trait can be complicated. For example, the chances of somebody dying of cancer or heart disease seems to depend on both their genes and their lifestyle.

Genes are made from a long molecule called DNA, which is copied and inherited across generations. DNA is made of simple units that line up in a particular order within it, carrying genetic information. The language used by DNA is called genetic code, which lets organisms read the information in the genes. This information is the instructions for the construction and operation of a living organism.

The information within a particular gene is not always exactly the same between one organism and another, so different copies of a gene do not always give exactly the same instructions. Each unique form of a single gene is called an allele. As an example, one allele for the gene for hair color could instruct the body to produce much pigment, producing black hair, while a different allele of the same gene might give garbled instructions that fail to produce any pigment, giving white hair. Mutations are random changes in genes and can create new alleles. Mutations can also produce new traits, such as when mutations to an allele for black hair produce a new allele for white hair. This appearance of new traits is important in evolution.

== Genes and inheritance ==
A section of DNA; the sequence of the plate-like units (nucleotides) in the center carries information.

Genes are pieces of DNA that contain information for the synthesis of ribonucleic acids (RNAs) or polypeptides. Genes are inherited as units, with two parents dividing out copies of their genes to their offspring. Humans have two copies of each of their genes, but each egg or sperm cell only gets one of those copies for each gene. An egg and sperm join to form a zygote with a complete set of genes. The resulting offspring has the same number of genes as their parents, but for any gene, one of their two copies comes from their father and one from their mother.

=== Example of mixing ===
The effects of mixing depend on the types (the alleles) of the gene. If the father has two copies of an allele for red hair, and the mother has two copies for brown hair, all their children get the two alleles that give different instructions, one for red hair and one for brown. The hair color of these children depends on how these alleles work together. If one allele dominates the instructions from another, it is called the dominant allele, and the allele that is overridden is called the recessive allele. In the case of a daughter with alleles for both red and brown hair, brown is dominant and she ends up with brown hair.

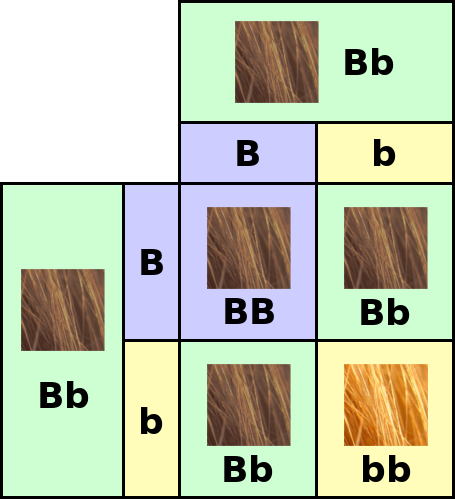
A Punnett square showing how two brown haired parents can have red or brown haired children. 'B' is for brown and 'b' is for red.

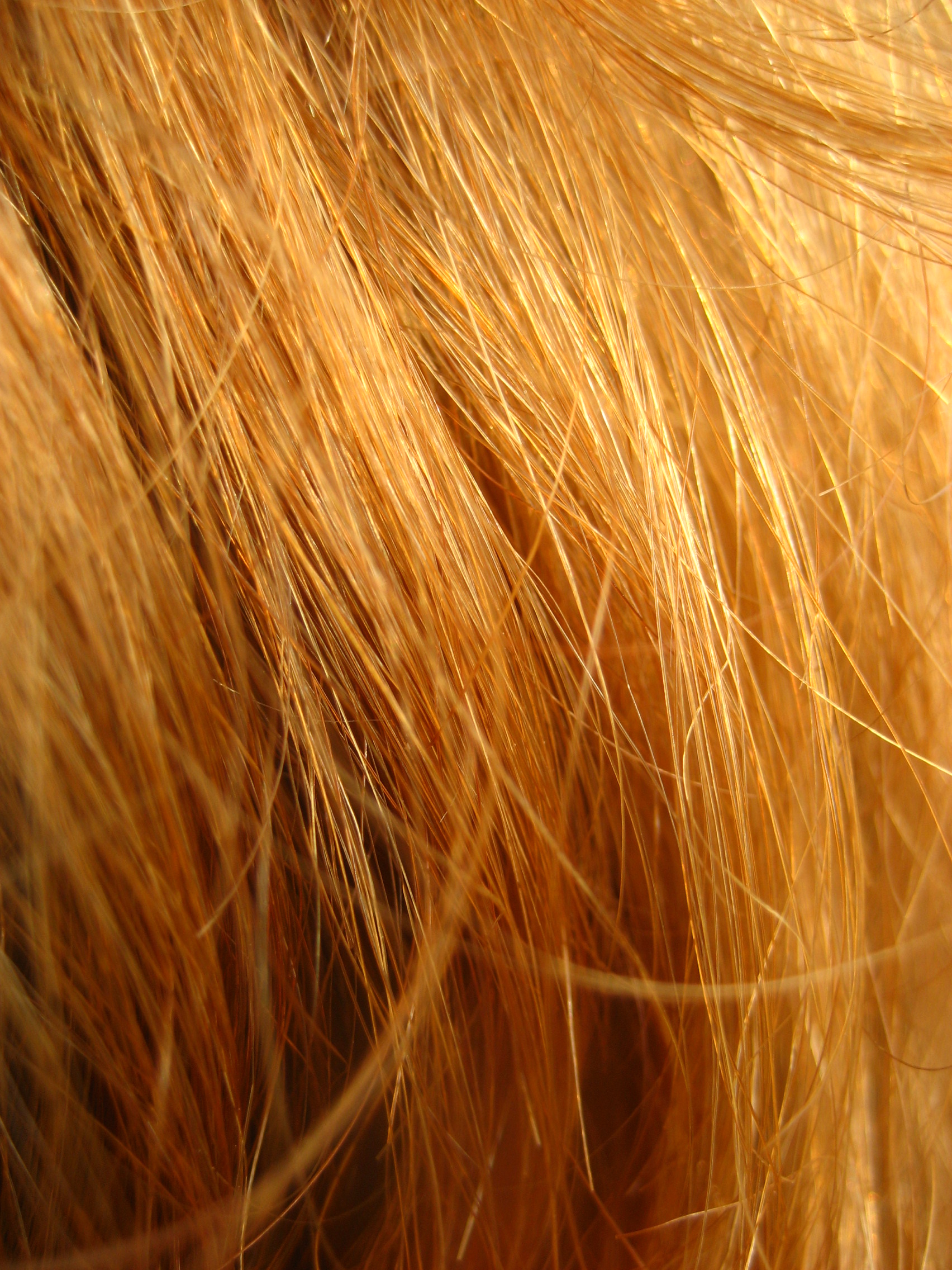
Red hair is a recessive trait in humans.

Although the red color allele is still there in this brown-haired girl, it doesn't show. This is a difference between what is seen on the surface (the traits of an organism, called its phenotype) and the genes within the organism (its genotype). In this example, the allele for brown can be called "B" and the allele for red "b". (It is normal to write dominant alleles with capital letters and recessive ones with lower-case letters.) The brown hair daughter has the "brown hair phenotype" but her genotype is Bb, with one copy of the B allele, and one of the b allele.

Now imagine that this woman grows up and has children with a brown-haired man who also has a Bb genotype. Her eggs will be a mixture of two types, one sort containing the B allele, and one sort the b allele. Similarly, her partner will produce a mix of two types of sperm containing one or the other of these two alleles. When the transmitted genes are joined up in their offspring, these children have a chance of getting either brown or red hair, since they could get a genotype of BB = brown hair, Bb = brown hair or bb = red hair. In this generation, there is, therefore, a chance of the recessive allele showing itself in the phenotype of the children—some of them may have red hair like their grandfather.

Many traits are inherited in a more complicated way than the example above. This can happen when there are several genes involved, each contributing a small part to the result. Tall people tend to have tall children because their children get a package of many alleles that each contribute a bit to how much they grow. However, there are not clear groups of "short people" and "tall people", like there are groups of people with brown or red hair. This is because of the large number of genes involved; this makes the trait very variable and people are of many different heights. Despite a common misconception, the green/blue eye traits are also inherited in this complex inheritance model. Inheritance can also be complicated when the trait depends on the interaction between genetics and environment. For example, malnutrition does not change traits like eye color, but can stunt growth.

== How genes work ==
=== Genes make proteins ===
The function of genes is to provide the information needed to make molecules called proteins in cells. Cells are the smallest independent parts of organisms: the human body contains about 100 trillion cells, while very small organisms like bacteria are just a single cell. A cell is like a miniature and very complex factory that can make all the parts needed to produce a copy of itself, which happens when cells divide. There is a simple division of labor in cells—genes give instructions and proteins carry out these instructions, tasks like building a new copy of a cell, or repairing the damage. Each type of protein is a specialist that only does one job, so if a cell needs to do something new, it must make a new protein to do this job. Similarly, if a cell needs to do something faster or slower than before, it makes more or less of the protein responsible. Genes tell cells what to do by telling them which proteins to make and in what amounts.

Genes are expressed by being transcribed into RNA, and this RNA then translated into protein.

A protein consists of a chain of amino acid molecules, of which there are 20 types. This chain folds up into a compact shape, rather like an untidy ball of string. The shape of the protein is determined by the sequence of amino acids along its chain, and it is this shape that determines what the protein does. For example, some proteins have parts of their surface that perfectly match the shape of another molecule, allowing the protein to bind to this molecule very tightly. Other proteins are enzymes, which are like tiny machines that alter other molecules.

The information in DNA is held in the sequence of the repeating units along the DNA chain. These units are four types of nucleotides (A, T, G and C) and the sequence of nucleotides stores information in an alphabet called the genetic code. When a gene is read by a cell the DNA sequence is copied into a very similar molecule called RNA (this process is called transcription). Transcription is controlled by other DNA sequences (such as promoters), which show a cell where genes are, and control how often they are copied. The RNA copy made from a gene is then fed through a structure called a ribosome, which translates the sequence of nucleotides in the RNA into the correct sequence of amino acids and joins these amino acids together to make a complete protein chain. The new protein then folds up into its active form. The process of moving information from the language of RNA into the language of amino acids is called translation.

DNA replication. DNA is unwound and nucleotides are matched to make two new strands.

If the sequence of the nucleotides in a gene changes, the sequence of the amino acids in the protein it produces may also change—if part of a gene is deleted, the protein produced is shorter and may not work anymore. This is the reason why different alleles of a gene can have different effects on an organism. As an example, hair color depends on how much of a dark substance called melanin is put into the hair as it grows. If a person has a normal set of the genes involved in making melanin, they make all the proteins needed and they grow dark hair. However, if the alleles for a particular protein have different sequences and produce proteins that can't do their jobs, no melanin is produced and the person has white skin and hair (albinism).

=== Genes are copied ===
Genes are copied each time a cell divides into two new cells. The process that copies DNA is called DNA replication. It is through a similar process that a child inherits genes from its parents when a copy from the mother is mixed with a copy from the father.

DNA can be copied very easily and accurately because each piece of DNA can direct the assembly of a new copy of its information. This is because DNA is made of two strands that pair together like the two sides of a zipper. The nucleotides are in the center, like the teeth in the zipper, and pair up to hold the two strands together. Importantly, the four different sorts of nucleotides are different shapes, so for the strands to close up properly, an A nucleotide must go opposite a T nucleotide, and a G opposite a C. This exact pairing is called base pairing.

When DNA is copied, the two strands of the old DNA are pulled apart by enzymes; then they pair up with new nucleotides and then close. This produces two new pieces of DNA, each containing one strand from the old DNA and one newly made strand. This process is not predictably perfect as proteins attach to a nucleotide while they are building and cause a change in the sequence of that gene. These changes in the DNA sequence are called mutations. Mutations produce new alleles of genes. Sometimes these changes stop the functioning of that gene or make it serve another advantageous function, such as the melanin genes discussed above. These mutations and their effects on the traits of organisms are one of the causes of evolution.

== Genes and evolution ==
Mice with different coat colors

A population of organisms evolves when an inherited trait becomes more common or less common over time. For instance, all the mice living on an island would be a single population of mice: some with white fur, some gray. If over generations, white mice became more frequent and gray mice less frequent, then the color of the fur in this population of mice would be evolving. In terms of genetics, this is called an increase in allele frequency.

Alleles become more or less common either by chance in a process called genetic drift or by natural selection. In natural selection, if an allele makes it more likely for an organism to survive and reproduce, then over time this allele becomes more common. But if an allele is harmful, natural selection makes it less common. In the above example, if the island were getting colder each year and snow became present for much of the time, then the allele for white fur would favor survival since predators would be less likely to see them against the snow, and more likely to see the gray mice. Over time white mice would become more and more frequent, while gray mice less and less.

Mutations create new alleles. These alleles have new DNA sequences and can produce proteins with new properties. So if an island was populated entirely by black mice, mutations could happen creating alleles for white fur. The combination of mutations creating new alleles at random, and natural selection picking out those that are useful, causes an adaptation. This is when organisms change in ways that help them to survive and reproduce. Many such changes, studied in evolutionary developmental biology, affect the way the embryo develops into an adult body.

== Inherited diseases ==
Some diseases are hereditary and run in families; others, such as infectious diseases, are caused by the environment. Other diseases come from a combination of genes and the environment. Genetic disorders are diseases that are caused by one or more abnormalities in the genome and are inherited in families. These may be monogenic (caused by alterations in a single gene), polygenic (caused by alterations in multiple genes). Examples of monogenic gene disorders include Huntington's disease, cystic fibrosis or Duchenne muscular dystrophy. Cystic fibrosis, for example, is caused by mutations in the CFTR gene and is inherited as a recessive trait.

Other diseases are influenced by genetics, but the genes a person gets from their parents only change their risk of getting a disease. Most of these diseases are inherited in a complex way, with either multiple genes involved, or coming from both genes and the environment. As an example, the risk of breast cancer is 50 times higher in the families most at risk, compared to the families least at risk. This variation is probably due to a large number of alleles, each changing the risk a little bit. Several of the genes have been identified, such as BRCA1 and BRCA2, but not all of them. However, although some of the risks are genetic, the risk of this cancer is also increased by being overweight, heavy alcohol consumption and not exercising. A woman's risk of breast cancer, therefore, comes from a large number of alleles interacting with her environment, so it is very hard to predict.

== Genetic engineering ==
Since traits come from the genes in a cell, putting a new piece of DNA into a cell can produce a new trait. This is how genetic engineering works. For example, rice can be given genes from a maize and a soil bacteria so the rice produces beta-carotene, which the body converts to vitamin A. This can help children with Vitamin A deficiency. Another gene being put into some crops comes from the bacterium Bacillus thuringiensis; the gene makes a protein that is an insecticide. The insecticide kills insects that eat the plants but is harmless to people. In these plants, the new genes are put into the plant before it is grown, so the genes are in every part of the plant, including its seeds. The plant's offspring inherit the new genes, which has led to concern about the spread of new traits into wild plants.

The kind of technology used in genetic engineering is also being developed to treat people with genetic disorders in an experimental medical technique called gene therapy. However, here the new, properly working gene is put in targeted cells, not altering the chance of future children inheriting the disease causing alleles.

== See also ==
- Common misunderstandings of genetics
- Epigenetics
- Whole genome sequencing
- History of genetics
- Genetics in simple English
- Outline of genetics
- Molecular genetics
- Predictive medicine
