= GeneTree =

Family history website

- Website type: Family history website
- Owner: Sorenson Molecular Genealogy Foundation (2001–2013)
- Commercial: Yes
- Launched: 1997
- Current status: Closed on January 1, 2013

GeneTree was a family history website focused on using DNA testing to trace ancestry. A website account was free, and within their account users could order DNA tests, enter results from other testing companies, search the DNA database, create an online family tree, and correspond with family members – including sharing pictures.

Genetree.com was closed on January 1, 2013 and its assets were transferred to Ancestry.com.

== History ==
GeneTree was founded in 1997 by a graduate of Wayne State University’s Center for Molecular Medicine and Genetics, Terrence Carmichael, who earned a master’s degree in molecular biology and genetics in 1995. Genetree did not offer multi-generational genealogy tests initially. Carmichael declared, “Over 95 percent of our first-year business was in paternity testing.” In fall 2001, GeneTree sold its assets to Salt Lake City-based Sorenson Molecular Genealogy Foundation ("SMGF") which originated in 1999.

The GeneTree website brought together elements of several existing Sorenson Companies: DNA testing by Sorenson Genomics, the DNA-genealogy database established by the SMGF research project, and the media sharing abilities of Sorenson Media.

In 2012, Ancestry.com announced to its customers, "In March, Ancestry.com DNA, LLC acquired access to an extensive collection of DNA assets from SMGF." Genetree.com was discontinued on January 1, 2013 and access to family trees was no longer made available through the GeneTree site. Prior to that date, Ancestry.com offered their subscribers who were former GeneTree customers an opportunity to download their DNA test results and manually enter them at Ancestry.com. Beginning January 1, 2013, those who don't have a current subscription to Ancestry.com no longer had access to their GeneTree DNA results.

== DNA tests ==
=== Y chromosome ===
GeneTree offered Y chromosome DNA testing (males only) that gives information about paternal ancestry, including 33-marker and a 46-marker test. YDNA is passed from father to son, so males with the same YDNA often have the same surname in addition to sharing a male ancestor.

=== Mitochondrial DNA ===
GeneTree offered mitochondrial DNA testing (males and females) that gives information about maternal ancestry. GeneTree's tests look at HVR1, HVR2, and HVR3 of the mtDNA. mtDNA is passed from mother to children, so people with the same mtDNA share a female ancestor.

== DNA and genealogy services ==
In addition to DNA testing services, GeneTree sold consultation services to help customers further understand their test results.

== Press ==
- Family Tree Magazine lists GeneTree as one of 10 best websites for sharing and storing family history, Sep 2009.
- 'The Secrets in Your DNA' (Dec 2007) at Nightline
- GeneTree launch (Oct 2007) at Reuters
- Interview with CEO James Lee Sorenson at Businessweek

== See also ==
- Genetic genealogy
- Genealogical DNA test
- Human Y-chromosome DNA haplogroups
- Human mitochondrial DNA haplogroups
