= One-name study =

Research of a specific surname

A one-name study is a project researching a specific surname, as opposed to a particular pedigree (ancestors of one person) or descendancy (descendants of one person or couple). Some people who research a specific surname may restrict their research geographically and chronologically, perhaps to one country and time period, while others may collect all occurrences world-wide for all time.

A one-name study is not limited to persons who are related biologically. Studies may have a number of family trees which have no link with each other.

Findings from a one-name study are useful to genealogists. Onomasticians, who study the etymology, meaning and geographic origin of names, also draw on the macro perspective provided by a one-name study.

== Scope ==
Many people conducting family history, genealogical or onomastic research may conduct a one-name study of a surname in a given period or locality quite informally.

A full one-name study can be daunting, particularly if the surname is very common. Conversely, a rare surname can be difficult to trace. Since such studies are usually conducted by individuals as a pastime, they are generally feasible only when a surname is not used by more than a couple of thousand contemporary people, so that the total historical data-set is numbered in the low tens of thousands. Where a surname is used by hundreds of thousands, or millions of people, it would be practically impossible to differentiate these persons using national-index data alone.

In some cultures, one-name studies are impossible, since hereditary surnames are not used at all or in the case of names such as Singh may represent religious practice rather than ancestry. Since a majority of human societies use patronymic surnames, one-name studies generally focus on male succession and ignore family relationships through marriage.

Some researchers are satisfied to collect all information and group it geographically, approximately representing the different family groups. Others attempt to reconstruct lineages.

In most one-name studies, a united lineage will not be discovered, but broad perspectives can be achieved, giving clues to name origins and migrations. Many researchers are motivated to go beyond the one-name-study stage and to compile fully researched, single-family histories of some of the families they discover.

== Methods ==
Accessibility of the data required for a one-name study varies from country to country. Where civil registration indexes are open to public search, they may not be online or gathered in the national capital, but are scattered through the states, as in Australia, or towns, as in France and the United States. In many countries, such as Germany, civil registration and census data are regarded as a state prerogative: vital data are only available to the persons concerned and 19th-century census returns are not available at all.

One-name studies in the United States have become more feasible than they were, thanks to the increased availability of online indexes to 19th-century and early-20th-century censuses.

More limited one-name studies can be conducted using other national indexes including:

- telephone and address directories
- registers of wills or deceased estates
- electoral rolls
- land possession records
- military service indexes

One-name studies are generally rounded out with a miscellany of information drawn from national bibliographies, archival catalogues, patent databases, reports of law cases, tax lists, newspaper indexes and web searches. A one-name researcher may also report on the linguistic origins of the surname and its use in place names and corporate names.

=== UK surnames ===
Civil registration indexes of births, marriages and deaths in England and Wales (for the period from 1837), Scotland (from 1855) and Northern Ireland (from 1865 and Protestant marriages from 1845) are in the public domain, and anyone may apply to see the details of any birth, marriage or death. For the period before civil registration, in principle back to 1538 in England and Wales and 1533 in Scotland, parish registers have recorded birth and/or baptisms, marriages and deaths and/or burials. These are also freely available, although the survival of such registers is less likely as we reach back to the earliest dates of this period.

The civil registration index books for England and Wales were scanned and made available online in 2004 by the subscription web site Findmypast (formerly 1837online) and an index has also been created by volunteers for the free web site FreeBMD. Records for Scotland can be searched at the pay-per-view web site ScotlandsPeople, and this means that a one-name study with a British focus can be conducted from anywhere in the world. Civil registration indexes for Northern Ireland can be viewed at the General Register Office (Northern Ireland) (GRONI) on payment of an entrance fee.

Censuses have taken place in England, Wales, Scotland and Ireland since the 1800s. The Irish Census returns for the years 1841 to 1891 are not available having been destroyed. Otherwise information from the 10-yearly censuses from 1841 until 1911 is available and facilitates the linking of surname data into family groups.

Since it is possible to extract a complete data-set of a given surname from these public records, ancestries of most 20th-century persons with a particular surname in England and Wales can be compiled without needing any contact to the persons concerned.

== Tools ==
While most one-name studies are conducted as a pastime, rather than as an economic activity, the sheer volume of information to be organised may require semi-professional data-processing and publishing skills. To avoid retyping large volumes of data by hand, one-name researchers are often skilled at data scraping and automated reformatting. The data must be carefully structured. An accurate copy of the original indexes must be drawn up, and updated when they are amended. Errors and conflicts in the indexes are noted. Links to those tables appear in the roll of individual persons.

Many one-name researchers keep data tables in computer spreadsheets because it is possible to see hundreds of items on a single screen and use thinking power to detect patterns. Genealogy software is used by many researchers to collate and define family trees. Others employ relational database software.

Increasingly one-namers are becoming involved in Surname DNA projects, using Y-DNA testing to analyse relationships among different lineages bearing the same surname (or suspected spelling variants).

== Motivation and support ==
One-name researchers often begin a study in the hope that obtaining a massive data set will give them sufficient perspective to break through a barrier in their own family history research. Some are motivated by the belief, only rarely borne out, that kinship can be documented among all persons sharing a surname.

The Guild of One-Name Studies was established in the United Kingdom in September 1979, and maintains a register of surnames being researched by members. It is a channel for anyone wishing to contact the person researching a particular registered name. In 2014 the Guild had over 2,000 world-wide members conducting studies of individual surnames and their variants.

== Publication ==
Traditionally, publication of definitive research is undertaken by printing a book or by publishing a one-name periodical. Such publications are often sponsored by formally established one-name groups. The UK-based Federation of Family History Societies includes several One-Name Societies, whilst the Guild of One-Name Studies has many members who are associated with such organisations. Advice on setting up a one-name group appears in a short booklet, "One-Name Family History Groups" by Derek Palgrave published by the Halsted Trust in 2008.

Today many studies are presented online, since the data can be continually updated and made available worldwide.

A number of Guild of One-Name Studies members have taken advantage of the member benefit called the Members Website Project (MWP) which enables a members to both share and publish their study as a website whilst continuing to work on their study.

== See also ==
- Surname DNA project
- Extinction of surnames
- Carpenter, John R. (23 May 2017). "DNA Testing – What you need to know first" (PDF). The Carpenter Cousins Project.
