= International Society of Genetic Genealogy =

History

- Abbreviation: ISOGG
- Formation: 2005; 21 years ago
- Purpose: To advocate for and educate about the use of genetics as a tool for genealogical research, and promote a supportive network for genetic genealogists
- Members: 8,000
- Director: Katherine Borges
- Website: www.isogg.org

The International Society of Genetic Genealogy (ISOGG) is an independent non-commercial nonprofit organization of genetic genealogists run by volunteers. It was founded by a group of surname DNA project administrators in 2005 to promote DNA testing for genealogy. It advocates the use of genetics in genealogical research, provides educational resources for genealogists interested in DNA testing, and facilitates networking among genetic genealogists. As of June 2013, it comprises over 8,000 members in 70 countries. As of July 2013, regional meetings are coordinated by 20 volunteer regional coordinators located in the United States, Australia, Brazil, Canada, England, Egypt, Ireland and Russia.

ISOGG hosts the ISOGG Wiki, a free online encyclopedia maintained by ISOGG members which contains a wide variety of educational resources and guidance for genetic genealogy consumers and DNA project administrators. The ISOGG Wiki contains ethical guidelines for DNA project administrators and ISOGG members perform peer reviews of DNA project websites of other members on request, following which the websites may display the ISOGG Peer Reviewed graphic.

== Industry regulation and standards ==
In 2008 ISOGG supported the passing of the Genetic Information Nondiscrimination Act designed to prohibit the improper use of genetic information in health insurance and employment in the United States. At an FDA public meeting on oversight of laboratory developed tests, ISOGG opposed FDA regulations preventing consumer access to DTC testing.

An article published in Genetics in Medicine in March 2012 provides an overview of the diverse array of tests and practices in the emerging DTC genetic genealogy industry. In the article, the authors highlight ISOGG's potential role in developing industry best practice guidelines and consumer guidance:

We call on the International Society of Genetic Genealogy (ISOGG) to take a leadership role in (i) articulating an ethical code to guide the practices of the industry it advocates and (ii) developing a consumer guide to provide prospective consumers of the DNA ancestry testing industry with a reliable means to compare products and companies for their varying consumer motivations and interests.

The increasing affordability and popularity of DTC genetic genealogy testing has also raised ethical concerns about genealogists testing the DNA of others without consent. The ISOGG Wiki contains a selection of external resources on ethics for genetic genealogists.

=== Y-STR nomenclature ===
ISOGG promotes the adoption of voluntary industry Y-STR nomenclature standards developed by NIST and published in the Journal of Genetic Genealogy in 2008.

== Citizen science ==
ISOGG members such as Leo Little, Roberta Estes, Rebekah Canada and Bonnie Schrack have been involved in important citizen science discoveries regarding human phylogeny and ethnic origins. The broader ISOGG membership participated in the Genographic Project, a genetic anthropology study that used crowdsourcing to facilitate new discoveries about human genetic history, and other genetic databases where broader and larger databases aid the identification of participants' ancestral origins.

=== Y chromosome phylogenetic tree ===
Since 2006, ISOGG has hosted the online ISOGG Y-chromosome phylogenetic tree. The tree was intended to incorporate newly discovered SNPs as genetic research progressed. However, it has not been regularly updated since 2020. The ISOGG tree has been described by academics as using the accepted nomenclature for human Y-chromosome DNA haplogroups and subclades in that it follows the Y Chromosome Consortium nomenclature as described in Karafet et al. 2008, The ISOGG tree is widely cited in peer reviewed academic literature.

== See also ==
- Genealogical DNA test
- Genetic diversity
- Human genetics
- Human genetic variation
- Human mitochondrial DNA haplogroups
- Human Y-chromosome DNA haplogroups
- Mitochondrial Eve
- Y-chromosomal Adam
- Y-chromosome haplogroups in populations of the world
- Personal genomics
- ISOGG Mission Statement
- History of genetic genealogy on the ISOGG wiki
