= Beverley Taylor Sorenson =

American education philanthropist

- Born: Beverley Taylor; April 13, 1924; Salt Lake City, Utah, U.S.
- Died: May 27, 2013 (aged 89)
- Education: University of Utah
- Occupations: Philanthropist, arts education advocate, schoolteacher, businesswoman

Beverley Taylor Sorenson (April 13, 1924 – May 27, 2013) was an American education philanthropist and advocate for the promotion of arts in elementary schools.

== Personal life ==
Sorenson was born in Salt Lake City, Utah. She was the daughter of Frank Campbell Taylor and Bessie Elinor Taylor, and the fifth of six children. She was a member of the Church of Jesus Christ of Latter-day Saints.

During her upbringing, Sorenson danced and played the piano. She attended Irving Junior High and East High School. In 1945, she graduated from the University of Utah with a bachelor's degree in education. That same year, Sorenson moved to New York City and became a kindergarten teacher.

There, she met James LeVoy Sorenson and they were married the next summer on July 23, 1946 at the Logan Utah Temple. They had eight children and settled in Salt Lake City. At the time of her death they had 49 grandchildren and 65 great-grandchildren. Sorenson died on May 27, 2013.

== Career ==
From 1945 to 1946, Sorenson was a schoolteacher at a Quaker school in New York. In 1975, Sorenson became the owner and manager of ExCelCis Cosmetics/LeVoys Fashions. From 1989 to 1995 she was the owner and manager of the Continental Beauty College.

Sorenson became the founder of Art Works for Kids in 1995 and the co-founder of the Sorenson Legacy Foundation in 2005.

In 2008, the Utah State Legislature adapted Sorenson's arts-focused teaching model to integrate arts into elementary education. In her honor, they named it the Beverley Taylor Sorenson Arts Learning Program.

== Sorenson Legacy Foundation ==
Sorenson was a philanthropist and supported many causes through the Sorenson Legacy Foundation. Among those causes, the foundation donated 45 million dollars to support fine arts instruction for children and teachers. She established endowments for elementary arts education at seven universities:

- Brigham Young University
  - Additionally, the Sorenson family's gift to the David O. McKay School of Education supports the BYU ARTS Partnership to increase the quality and quantity of arts education in local elementary schools.
- University of Utah
- Utah State University
- Utah Tech University
- Southern Utah University
- Weber State University
- Westminster College.

== Recognitions ==
- The Beverley Taylor Sorenson Arts and Education Complex at The University of Utah, Built in 2014.
- The Beverley Taylor Sorenson Center for the Arts, a building at Southern Utah University built in 2016.
- Honorary Doctorates from Southern Utah University, Salt Lake Community College, University of Utah, Utah State University, and Westminster College.

=== Awards ===
- Award for Arts Achievement and Excellence for the International Council of Fine Arts Deans
- Living Legacy Award from the Boys and Girls Club
- The Eli and Edythe Broad Award for Philanthropy in the Arts from Americans for the Arts.
