= Genetic genealogy =

DNA testing to infer relationships

Genetic genealogy is the use of genealogical DNA tests, i.e., DNA profiling and DNA testing, in combination with traditional genealogical methods, to infer genetic relationships between individuals. This application of genetics came to be used by family historians in the 21st century, as DNA tests became affordable. The tests have been promoted by amateur groups, such as surname study groups or regional genealogical groups, as well as research projects such as the Genographic Project.

As of 2021, about 40 million people had been tested. As the field developed, the aims of practitioners broadened, with many seeking knowledge of their ancestry beyond the recent centuries, for which traditional pedigrees can be constructed.

== History ==
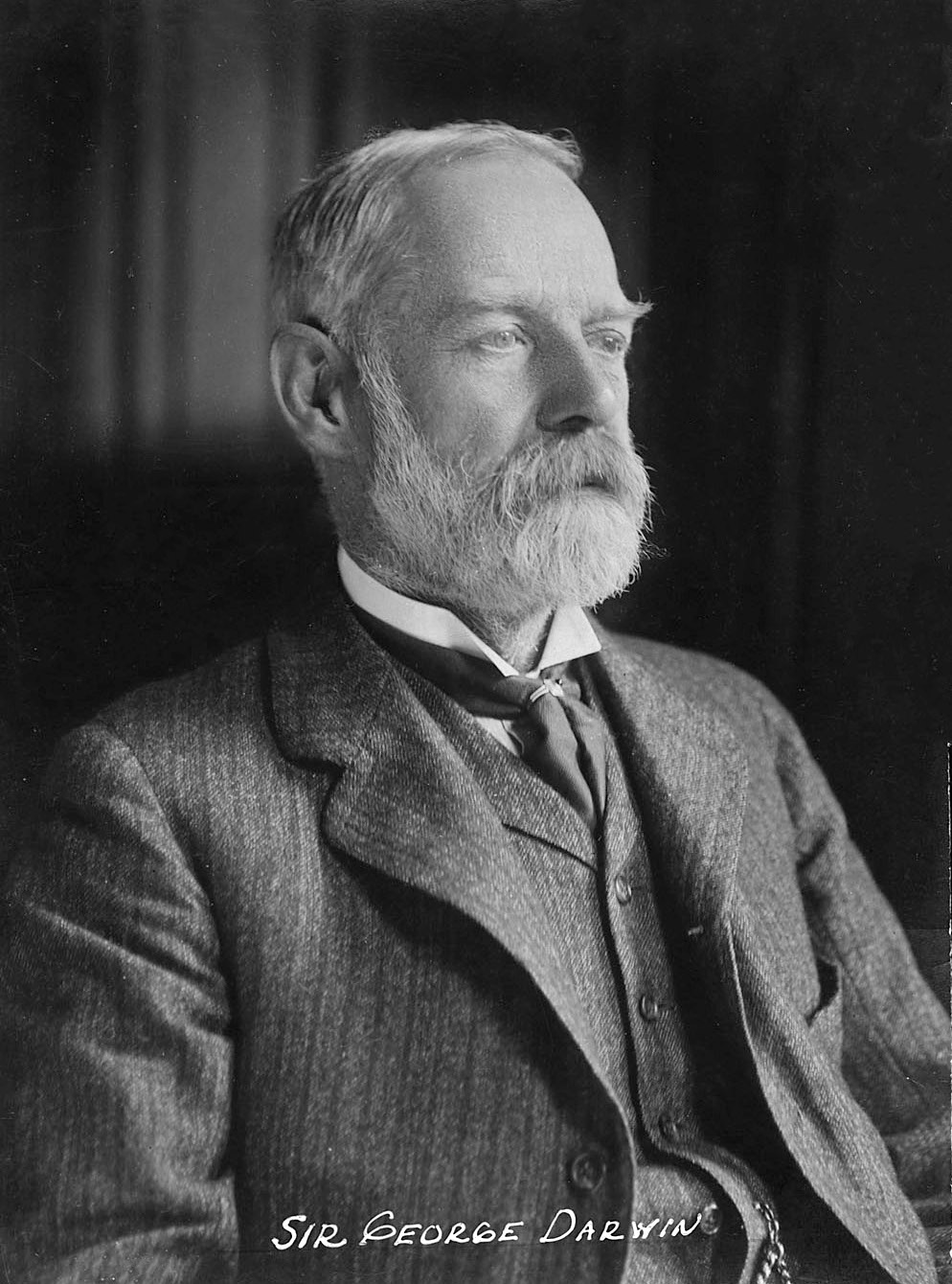
George Darwin, the first person to estimate the frequency of first-cousin marriages

The investigation of surnames in genetics can be said to go back to George Darwin, a son of Charles Darwin and Charles' first cousin Emma Darwin. In 1875, George Darwin used surnames to estimate the frequency of first-cousin marriages and calculated the expected incidence of marriage between people of the same surname (isonymy). He arrived at a figure of 1.5% for cousin-marriage in the population of London, higher (3%-3.5%) among the upper classes and lower (2.25%) among the general rural population.

=== Surname studies ===
A famous study in 1998 examined the lineage of descendants of Thomas Jefferson's paternal line and male lineage descendants of the freed slave Sally Hemings.

Bryan Sykes, a molecular biologist at Oxford University, tested the new methodology in general surname research. His study of the Sykes surname, published in 2000, obtained results by looking at four STR markers on the male chromosome. It pointed the way to genetics becoming a valuable assistant in the service of genealogy and history.

=== Direct-to-consumer DNA testing ===
In 2000, Family Tree DNA was the first company to provide direct-to-consumer genetic testing for genealogy research. It initially offered eleven-marker Y-chromosome STR tests and HVR1 mitochondrial DNA tests but not multi-generational genealogy tests. In 2001, GeneTree was acquired by Sorenson Molecular Genealogy Foundation (SMGF), which provided free Y-chromosome and mitochondrial DNA (mtDNA) tests. GeneTree later returned to genetic testing in conjunction with its Sorenson parent company until it was acquired by Ancestry.com in 2012.

In 2007, 23andMe was the first company to offer saliva-based direct-to-consumer testing, and the first to use autosomal DNA for ancestry testing. An autosome is one of the 22 chromosomes other than the X or Y chromosomes. They are transmitted from all ancestors in recent generations and so can be used to match with other testers who may be related. Companies were later also able to use this data to estimate how much of each ethnicity a customer has. FamilyTreeDNA entered this market in 2010, followed by AncestryDNA in 2012, and the number of tests grew rapidly. By 2018 autosomal testing had become the predominant type of test, and for many companies the only test they offered.

MyHeritage launched its testing service in 2016, allowing users to use cheek swabs to collect samples, and introduced new analysis tools in 2019: autoclusters (grouping matches visually into clusters) and family tree theories (suggesting conceivable relations between DNA matches by combining several MyHeritage trees and the Geni global family tree). Living DNA, founded in 2015, uses SNP chips to provide reports on autosomal ancestry, Y, and mtDNA ancestry.

By 2019, the combined total of customers at the four largest companies was 26 million. By August 2019, it was reported that about 30 million people had had their DNA tested for genealogical purposes.

GEDmatch said in 2018 that about half of their one million profiles were American. Due to the limited geographical distribution of DNA testees, databases and results limit knowledge of variation present in other racial groups. However, this can only be remedied by testing more individuals, making geneticists aware of the genetic variation present in currently underrepresented testees.

=== Genetic genealogy revolution ===
The publication of The Seven Daughters of Eve by Sykes in 2001, which described the seven major haplogroups of European ancestors, helped push personal ancestry testing through DNA tests into wide public notice. With the growing availability and affordability of genealogical DNA testing, genetic genealogy as a field grew rapidly. By 2003, the field of DNA testing of surnames was declared officially to have "arrived" in an article by Jobling and Tyler-Smith in Nature Reviews Genetics. The number of firms offering tests, and the number of consumers ordering them, rose dramatically. In 2018, a paper in Science Magazine estimated that a DNA genealogy search on anybody of European descent would result in a third cousin or closer match 60% of the time.

=== Genographic Project ===
The original Genographic Project was a five-year research study launched in 2005 by the National Geographic Society and IBM, in partnership with the University of Arizona and Family Tree DNA. Its goals were primarily anthropological. The project announced that by April 2010 it had sold more than 350,000 of its public participation testing kits, which test the general public for either twelve STR markers on the Y chromosome or mutations on the HVR1 region of the mtDNA.

The phase of the project in 2016 was Geno 2.0 Next Generation. As of 2018, almost one-million participants in over 140 countries had joined the project. In 2019, it was announced that from the end of May no further testing kits would be sold and results would only be available to the end of 2020.

=== Typical customers and interest groups ===
Genetic genealogy has enabled groups of people to trace their ancestry even though they are not able to use conventional genealogical techniques. This may be because they do not know one or both of their birth parents or because conventional genealogical records have been lost, destroyed or never existed. These groups include adoptees, foundlings, Holocaust survivors, GI babies, child migrants, descendants of children from orphan trains and people with slave ancestry.

The earliest test takers were customers most often those who started with a Y-chromosome test to determine their father's paternal ancestry. These men often took part in surname projects. The first phase of the Genographic Project brought new participants into genetic genealogy. Those who tested were as likely to be interested in direct maternal heritage as their paternal. The number of those taking mtDNA tests increased. The introduction of autosomal SNP tests based on microarray chip technology changed the demographics. Women were as likely as men to test themselves.

=== Citizen science and ISOGG ===
Members of the genetic genealogy community have been credited with making useful contributions to knowledge in the field, an example of citizen science.

One of the earliest interest groups to emerge was the International Society of Genetic Genealogy (ISOGG). Their stated goal is to promote DNA testing for genealogy. Members advocate the use of genetics in genealogical research and the group facilitates networking among genetic genealogists. Since 2006 ISOGG has maintained the regularly updated ISOGG Y-chromosome phylogenetic tree. ISOGG aims to keep the tree as up-to-date as possible, incorporating new SNPs. However, the tree has been described by academics as not completely academically verified, phylogenetic trees of Y chromosome haplogroups.

== Uses ==
=== Direct maternal lineages ===
Mitochondrial DNA (mtDNA) testing involves sequencing at least part of the mitochondrial genome. The mitochondrial DNA is transmitted from mother to child, and so can reveal information about the unbroken maternal line. When two individuals have matching or near matching mitochondrial DNA, it can be inferred that they share a common maternal-line ancestor at some point in the "recent" past. Care should be taken to avoid overstating the recency of a relationship however, as a mutation in the mitochondrial genome will only occur every 1000 to 3000 years on average. For this reason, it is usually impossible to distinguish between two individuals related within the last one or two millennia on the basis of mtDNA alone.

=== Direct paternal lineages ===
Y-Chromosome DNA (Y-DNA) testing involves short tandem repeat (STR) and, sometimes, single nucleotide polymorphism (SNP) testing of the Y-Chromosome, which is present only in males and only reveals information on the unbroken paternal line. As with the mitochondria, close matches with individuals indicate a recent common ancestor.

A father passes his entire Y chromosome—including the Male-Specific Y (MSY) region—to his son with very minimal change, barring occasional mutations. This region does not recombine with the mother's chromosomes (unlike autosomes and the X), so it is a nearly unshuffled genetic record of direct paternal descent. Y-chromosome lineages can be tracked with a standard phylogeny tree, using traditional data structures and monophylogeny.

Because surnames in many cultures are transmitted down the paternal line, this testing is often used by surname DNA projects.

While early studies using STRs made bold claims that large numbers of men descend from prominent historical individuals (e.g. Niall of the Nine Hostages and Genghis Khan), more recent SNP studies have shown many of these to be invalid. In particular, STR mutations are now known to be largely unreliable in proving kinship, as these mutations can appear in multiple unrelated lineages by chance.

To prove descent from a common ancestor in the male line, a Y-DNA clade requires triangulation back to a most recent common ancestor (MRCA), who is usually referred to by the name of the mutation (e.g. L21, U106, etc.) as a shorthand. A SNP mutation unique to a family or kin group is referred to as a "defining mutation", the testing of which can exclude men not related through the male line within one or two centuries at the most. This has been exploited in recent times to identify the defining mutations of noble and royal lineages, such as the Stewarts of Scotland and the Uí Briúin dynasty of Ireland.

=== Pedigree family trees ===
Pedigree family trees have traditionally been prepared from recollections of individuals about their parents and grandparents. These family trees may be extended if recollections of earlier generations were preserved through oral tradition or written documents. Some genealogists regard oral tradition as myths unless confirmed with written documentation like birth certificates, marriage certificates, census reports, headstones, or notes in family bibles. Few written records are kept by illiterate populations, and many documents have been destroyed by warfare or natural disasters. DNA comparison may offer an alternative means of confirming family relationships of biological parents, but may be confused by adoption or when a mother conceals the identity of the father of her child.

While mitochondrial and Y-chromosome DNA matching offer the most definitive confirmation of ancestral relationships, the information from a tested individual is relevant to a decreasing fraction of their ancestors from earlier generations. Potential ambiguity must be considered when seeking confirmation from comparison of autosomal DNA. The first source of ambiguity arises from the underlying similarity of every individual's DNA sequence. Many short gene segments will be identical by coincidental recombination (Identical by State: IBS) rather than inheritance from a single ancestor (Identical by Descent: IBD). Segments of greater length offer increased confidence of a shared ancestor. A second source of ambiguity results from the random distribution of genes to each child of a parent. Only identical twins inherit exactly the same gene segments. Although a child inherits exactly half of their DNA from each parent, the percentage inherited from any given ancestor in an earlier generation (with the exception of X chromosome DNA) varies within a normal distribution around a median value of 100% divided by the number of ancestors in that generation. An individual comparing autosomal DNA with ancestors of successively earlier generations will encounter an increasing number of ancestors from whom they inherited no DNA segments of significant length. Since individuals inherit only a small portion of their DNA from each of their great-grandparents, cousins descended from the same ancestor may not inherit the same DNA segments from that ancestor. All descendants of the same parent or grandparent, and nearly all descendants of the same great-grandparent, will share gene segments of significant length; but approximately 10% of 3rd cousins, 55% of 4th cousins, 85% of 5th cousins, and more than 95% of more distant cousins will share no gene segments of significant length. Failure to share a gene segment of significant length does not disprove the shared ancestry of a distant cousin.

The best autosomal DNA method for confirming ancestry is to compare DNA with known relatives. A more complicated task is using a DNA database to identify previously unknown individuals who share DNA with the individual of interest; and then attempting to find shared ancestors with those individuals. The first problem with the latter procedure involves the relatively poor family history knowledge of most database populations. A significant percentage of individuals in many DNA databases have done DNA testing because they are uncertain of their parentage, and many who confidently identify their parents are unable or unwilling to share information about earlier generations. It may be easier to identify a shared ancestor in the fortunate situation of shared DNA between two individuals with comprehensive family trees, but finding multiple shared ancestors raises the question of from which of those ancestors was the shared segment inherited. Resolving that ambiguity typically requires finding a third individual sharing both the ancestor and the gene segment of interest.

=== Ancestral origins ===
A common component of many autosomal tests is a prediction of biogeographical origin, often called ethnicity. A company offering the test uses computer algorithms and calculations to make a prediction of what percentage of an individual's DNA comes from particular ancestral groups. A typical number of populations is at least 20. Despite this aspect of the tests being heavily promoted and advertised, many genetic genealogists have warned consumers that the results may be inaccurate, and at best are only approximate.

Modern DNA sequencing has identified various ancestral components in contemporary populations. A number of these genetic elements have West Eurasian origins. They include the following ancestral components, with their geographical hubs and main associated populations:

#	West Eurasian component	Geographical hub	Peak population	Notes
1	Ancestral North Indian	Bangladesh, North India, Pakistan	Bangladeshis, North Indians, Pakistanis	Main West Eurasian component in the Indian subcontinent. Peaks among Indo-European-speaking caste populations in the northern areas, but also found at significant frequencies among some Dravidian-speaking caste groups. Associated with either the arrival of Indo-European speakers from West Asia or Central Asia between 3,000 and 4,000 years before present, or with the spread of agriculture and West Asian crops beginning around 8,000-9,000 ybp, or with migrations from West Asia in the pre-agricultural period. Contrasted with the indigenous Ancestral South Indian component, which peaks among the Onge Andamanese inhabiting the Andaman Islands.
2	Arabian	Arabian Peninsula	Yemenis, Saudis, Qataris, Bedouins	Main West Eurasian component in the Persian Gulf region. Most closely associated with local Arabic, Semitic-speaking populations. Also found at significant frequencies in parts of the Levant, Egypt and Libya.
3	Coptic	Nile Valley	Copts, Beja, Afro-Asiatic Ethiopians, Sudanese Arabs, Nubians	Main West Eurasian component in Northeast Africa. Roughly equivalent with the Ethio-Somali component. Peaks among Egyptian Copts in Sudan. Also found at high frequencies among other Afro-Asiatic (Hamito-Semitic) speakers in Ethiopia and Sudan, as well as among many Nubians. Associated with Ancient Egyptian ancestry, without the later Arabian influence present among modern Egyptians. Contrasted with the indigenous Nilo-Saharan component, which peaks among Nilo-Saharan- and Kordofanian-speaking populations inhabiting the southern part of the Nile Valley.
4	Ethio-Somali	Horn of Africa	Somalis, Afars, Amhara, Oromos, Tigrinya	Main West Eurasian component in the Horn. Roughly equivalent with the Coptic component. Associated with the arrival of Afro-Asiatic speakers in the region during antiquity. Peaks among Cushitic- and Ethiopian Semitic-speaking populations in the northern areas. Diverged from the Maghrebi component around 23,000 ybp, and from the Arabian component about 25,000 ybp. Contrasted with the indigenous Omotic component, which peaks among the Omotic-speaking Ari ironworkers inhabiting southern Ethiopia.
5	European	Europe	Europeans	Main West Eurasian component in Europe. Also found at significant frequencies in adjacent geographical areas outside of the continent, in Anatolia, the Caucasus, the Iranian plateau, and parts of the Levant.
6	Levantine	Near East, Caucasus	Druze, Lebanese, Cypriots, Syrians, Jordanians, Palestinians, Armenians, Georgians, Sephardic Jews, Ashkenazi Jews, Iranians, Turks, Sardinians, Adygei	Main West Eurasian component in the Near East and Caucasus. Peaks among Druze populations in the Levant. Found amongst local Afro-Asiatic, Indo-European, Caucasus and Turkish speakers alike. Diverged from the European component around 9,100-15,900 ybp, and from the Arabian component about 15,500-23,700 ypb. Also found at significant frequencies in Southern Europe as well as parts of the Arabian Peninsula.
7	Maghrebi	Northwest Africa	Berbers, Maghrebis, Sahrawis, Tuareg	Main West Eurasian component in the Maghreb. Peaks among the Berber (non-Arabized) populations in the region. Diverged from the Ethio-Somali/Coptic, Arabian, Levantine and European components prior to the Holocene.

=== Human migration ===
Genealogical DNA testing methods have been used on a longer time scale to trace human migratory patterns. For example, they determined when the first humans came to North America and what path they followed.

For several years, researchers and laboratories from around the world sampled indigenous populations from around the globe in an effort to map historical human migration patterns. The National Geographic Society's Genographic Project aims to map historical human migration patterns by collecting and analyzing DNA samples from over 100,000 people across five continents. The DNA Clans Genetic Ancestry Analysis measures a person's precise genetic connections to indigenous ethnic groups from around the world.

=== Law enforcement ===
Law enforcement may use genetic genealogy to track down perpetrators of violent crimes such as murder or sexual assault and they may also use it to identify deceased individuals. Initially genetic genealogy sites GEDmatch and Family Tree DNA allowed their databases to be used by law enforcement and DNA technology companies to do DNA testing for violent criminal cases and genetic genealogy research at the request of law enforcement. This investigative, or forensic, genetic genealogy technique became popular after the arrest of the alleged Golden State Killer in 2018, but has received significant backlash from privacy experts. However, in May 2019 GEDmatch made their privacy rules more restrictive, thereby reducing the incentive for law enforcement agencies to use their site. Other sites such as Ancestry.com, 23andMe and MyHeritage have data policies that say that they would not allow their customer data to be used for crime solving without a warrant from law enforcement as they believed it violated users' privacy.

== See also ==
- Allele
- Allele frequency
- Electropherogram
- Genetic recombination
- Haplotype
- Human mitochondrial DNA haplogroup
- Human mitochondrial genetics
- Human Y-chromosome DNA haplogroup
- Most recent common ancestor
- Non-paternity event
- List of Y-chromosome haplogroups in populations of the world
- Y-STR (Y-chromosome short tandem repeat)
