= C. Wilfred Griggs =

American Egyptologist

Charles Wilfred Griggs (born 1942) is a professor of ancient scripture at Brigham Young University.

== Biography ==
Griggs was educated at BYU and Stanford University. Griggs received his Ph.D. from the University of California, Berkeley.

Griggs currently holds the University Professorship of Ancient Studies at BYU. In addition to being a scholar of early Christian and Latter-day Saint history he is also an archeologist. In 1975–1976 he was part of a team doing excavations at the Nag Hammadi site in Egypt for UC Berkeley. In January–March 1981 he was the field director of the joint BYU and UC Berkeley excavation at Seila, Fayum, Egypt and he has been the head of BYU's Fayum excavation since 1982. Also in 1994 he was invited by the government of the Autonomous Republic of the Crimea to do excavations at Ancient Greek sites on the Crimea.

Griggs is a charter member of the Association of Ancient Historians and the International Association for Coptic Studies.

Among the books Griggs has written is Early Egyptian Christianity: From Its Origins to 451 C.E. (Brill, 2000). He has appeared in Operation Sethos: High Tech in the Tomb of the Pharaoh a TV mini-series and also in another TV episode about King Tut.

At BYU, Griggs has served as the director of ancient studies for the Religious Studies Center. He has also written several works on the Early Christian Church, mainly published in LDS-owned or -related periodicals. He has argued that in the Joseph Smith Translation of the Bible (JST), Paul was married. Griggs' interpretation was described by Deirdre Good as "among the more creative", but said she preferred to avoid "adding to Paul's words," as the JST does throughout.

In 1982 Griggs' article, "The Book of Mormon as an Ancient Book" was published in BYU Studies. He has also published in Coptic Studies and the Archaeological Textiles Newsletter. Some of his work has related to DNA issues in studying mummies and has been done in cooperation with Scott Woodward.

Griggs is the father of seven children.

Griggs is a Latter-day Saint. Among other callings he has served as the member of a stake high council and a bishop.
