= Indigenous Peoples Council on Biocolonialism =

US activist group

- Founded: 1999
- Type: Non-governmental organization
- Purpose: Indigenous rights
- Location: Nixon, Nevada, United States
- Region served: Worldwide
- Website: www.ipcb.org

The Indigenous Peoples Council on Biocolonialism (IPCB) is a non-profit organization based in Nixon, Nevada, for the purpose of political activism against the emergent field of population genetics for human migration research. The term "biocolonialism" is a neologism—a portmanteau of "bio-" and "colonialism"—used by the IPCB to pejoratively characterize population genetics research as part of invasive and destructive assimilation against indigenous peoples.

The group claims to advocate for the interests of indigenous peoples, to assist "in the protection of their genetic resources, indigenous knowledge, cultural and human rights from the negative effects of biotechnology." In particular, the IPCB's protests were based on a rejection of participating in scientific research that would negate or otherwise contradict traditional Native American accounts and narratives about their ancestral origins, and lend support to other alternative views.

IPCB was a signatory of the Indigenous Peoples' Seattle Declaration in 1999.

== History ==
The IPCB was founded in 1999 by the current Executive Director Debra Harry, following her growing concerns over a perceived impact of genetic colonialism on the lives of indigenous peoples. The organization objects to genetic variation research on isolated populations, as well as its prospective commercial exploration; claiming it as a global threat, not only to the self-determination of all indigenous peoples, but also to the non-indigenous world and to the earth itself.

In 2005 and 2006, the group protested against the National Geographic's Genographic Project.

== See also ==
- Convention on Biological Diversity
- George Annas, a director of IPCB
- Jonathan Marks, a director of IPCB
- Stuart Newman, a director of IPCB
