= Helix (genomics company) =

American population genomics company

- Type: Privately held company
- Industry: Genomics
- Founded: July 15, 2015
- Founders: Scott Burke, Justin Kao, James Lu
- Headquarters: San Mateo, California, United States
- Area served: United States
- Products: Genomic testing
- Number of employees: 150-200
- Website: www.helix.com

Helix is an American population genomics company.

== History ==
Helix focuses on personal genomics and citizen science. Helix has a marketplace that offers applications created by approved partners. Helix handles sample collection, DNA sequencing, and secure data storage and partners develop on-demand products. Helix is headquartered in the San Francisco Bay Area and operates a sequencing laboratory in San Diego.

In 2016, Helix partnered with the National Geographic Society to sequence DNA for the Genographic Project.

In 2018, Helix partnered with the Desert Research Institute and Renown Institute of Health Innovation in support of the Healthy Nevada project, which offers free access to genomic sequencing to 40,000 residents of northern Nevada for health research.

== Sequencing methodology ==
Helix uses NGS to sequence a proprietary assay called Exome+, a version of Exome sequencing which according to the company provides 100 times more data than was previously available. Exome+ includes all 22,000 protein-coding genes as well as additional regions known to be of interest. All samples are processed in Helix’s CLIA- and CAP-accredited sequencing lab powered by Illumina NGS technology, using the Exome+ assay.

== See also ==
- Genographic Project
