= James LeVoy Sorenson =

American businessman

- Born: July 30, 1921; Rexburg, Idaho, U.S.
- Died: January 20, 2008 (aged 86); Holladay, Utah, U.S.
- Occupation: Businessman
- Spouse: Beverley Taylor Sorenson
- Children: 8

James LeVoy Sorenson (July 30, 1921 – January 20, 2008) was an American businessman, the founder of Sorenson Companies, a parent company of 32 corporations. A noted philanthropist, he was the richest man in Utah with an estimated net worth of $4.5 billion. He donated his entire personal fortune to charity.

== Early life ==
Sorenson was born in Rexburg, Idaho, the son of Joseph LeVoy and Emma Blaser Sorenson, and was of Swedish, Norwegian and Swiss ancestry.

== Career ==
With only a high school diploma, he made a fortune in local real estate before expanding in other directions such as innovative technology. Sorenson holds roughly 60 patents, and is credited with a number of medical inventions including the disposable surgical mask and the disposable venous catheter.

One of his companies, Sorenson Genomics, has also begun a genetic database known as the Sorenson Molecular Genealogy Foundation, and claims to be the only laboratory in the world to have successfully identified victims in Thailand of the 2004 tsunami.

In 1982, Sorenson received the Golden Plate Award of the American Academy of Achievement.

In 2003, Sorenson was honored as the "Alumnus of the Year" by Sierra College in Rocklin, California, which he attended from 1940 to 1941. His pre-med studies were interrupted by World War II and a mission for the Church of Jesus Christ of Latter-day Saints.

On Wednesday, February 15, 2006, Sorenson received the "Giant of Our City" award in Salt Lake City for his philanthropy and effort in identifying the tsunami victims.

Upon his death, Sorenson donated his entire personal fortune to charity.

== Personal life ==
He was married to Beverley Taylor Sorenson, a great granddaughter of LDS Church President John Taylor. They had eight children — Carol Smith, Shauna Johnson, James Lee Sorenson, Ann Crocker, Joan Fenton, Joseph Sorenson, Gail Williamsen and Christine Harris.

Sorenson died on January 20, 2008, of cancer, aged 86. He was survived by a large extended family, including his wife, eight children and 47 grandchildren.

== See also ==
- List of billionaires
- Sorenson Molecular Genealogy Foundation
