= Jonathan M. Marks =

American biological anthropologist (born 1955)

- Born: Jonathan Mitchell Marks; February 8, 1955 (age 71)
- Occupation: Anthropologist
- Organization(s): University of North Carolina at Charlotte; Indigenous Peoples Council on Biocolonialism (Nixon, Nevada)
- Awards: W.W. Howells Book Prize; J. I. Staley Prize; First Citizens Bank Scholars Medal; GAD Prize for Exemplary Cross-Field Scholarship

Jonathan Mitchell Marks (born February 8, 1955) is a professor of biological anthropology at the University of North Carolina at Charlotte. He is known for his work comparing the genetics of humans and other apes, and for his critiques of scientific racism, biological determinism, and what he argues is an overemphasis on scientific rationalism in anthropology. He is a fellow of the American Association for the Advancement of Science.

== Early life and education ==
Born in 1955, Marks studied at the Johns Hopkins University in Baltimore and took graduate degrees in genetics and anthropology from the University of Arizona, completing his doctorate in 1984.

When Marks was beginning his career, few anthropologists held degrees in genetics. The Charlotte Observer quotes him as saying, “Twenty-five years ago I was sort of avant garde. Now it’s much more common.”

== Career ==
Marks is a leading figure in anthropology, especially when it comes to public discussions of race. His work has been praised by scholars such as Alondra Nelson, Agustín Fuentes, and Barbara J. King.

Marks did post-doctoral research in the genetics department at UC-Davis from 1984 to 1987, then taught at Yale for ten years and Berkeley for three, before settling in Charlotte where he is now a professor at the University of North Carolina-Charlotte.

Marks has also served on the board of directors of the Indigenous Peoples Council on Biocolonialism, Nixon, Nevada.

He was elected to a fellow of the American Association for the Advancement of Science in 2006.

In 2009, Santa Fe's School for Advanced Research awarded him its J. I. Staley Prize for his book What It Means to be 98% Chimpanzee: Apes, People and their Genes. In their award citation, the review panel noted that the book "is being read across anthropological disciplines" and "engages with issues directly relevant to the future of humanity."

He received the First Citizens Bank Scholars Medal in 2012, honoring his career of intellectual inquiry.

Since then he has been a Templeton Fellow (2013–2014) and a Director's Fellow (2019–2020) at the University of Notre Dame's Institute for Advanced Study, and a visiting research fellow at the Max Planck Institute for the History of Science in Berlin and at the ESRC Genomics Forum at the University of Edinburgh.

== Views ==
Marks' 2002 book What it Means to be 98% Chimpanzee argued that there is a significant gap between scientists' knowledge of genetics and their understanding of its functional significance. In opposition to biological determinism, Marks explores evidence for synergy between genetic and cultural factors in shaping human traits such as body shape, school performance, athleticism, and even menstrual cycles.

Marks' published works include many scholarly articles and essays. He is an outspoken critic of scientific racism, and has prominently argued against the idea that "race" is a natural category. In Marks's view, "race" is a negotiation between patterns of biological variation and patterns of perceived difference. He argues that race and human diversity are different subjects, and do not map on to one another well. This view is now the stated consensus of the American Association of Biological Anthropologists.

As described in his book Is Science Racist?, Marks considers science to have four epistemic qualities: naturalism, experimentalism, rationalism, and a primary value on accuracy. In this book and in Why I Am Not a Scientist, he argues that anthropologists have an ambiguous relationship with science because their goal of illuminating the human condition requires both scientific and humanistic frameworks.

In reference to the titles of his books, Marks has stated that "he would like it to be known, for the record, that he is about 98% scientist, and not a chimpanzee."

== Selected works ==
- Evolutionary Anthropology, with Edward Staski (1991). ISBN 978-0030237324.
- Human Biodiversity (1995). ISBN 3110148552.
- What It Means to be 98% Chimpanzee: Apes, People and their Genes (2002). ISBN 0520240642.
- Why I Am Not a Scientist (2009). ISBN 0520259602.
- The Alternative Introduction to Biological Anthropology (2010). ISBN 0195157036.
- Tales of the Ex-Apes: How We Think about Human Evolution (2015). ISBN 0520285824.
- Is Science Racist? (2017). ISBN 978-0745689227.
