= Guild of One-Name Studies =

UK charitable organization

- Abbreviation: GOONS, Guild of ONS
- Formation: 1979
- Purpose: The Guild is a charitable organisation dedicated to promoting the public understanding of one-name (surname) studies and the preservation and accessibility of the resultant information.
- Headquarters: London, England
- Region served: Worldwide
- Members: 2,725
- President: Howard Benbrook
- Affiliations: Federation of Family History Societies
- Website: one-name.org

The Guild of One-Name Studies is a UK-based charitable organisation founded in 1979 for one-name studies.

== History ==
The Guild developed as an offshoot of the Federation of Family History Societies. The FFHS was founded on 8 June 1974. By 1977 one-third of the members of the FFHS were one-name societies, and a sub-committee was set up to address the needs of this group. Among its duties was the generation of a Register of Surnames which were being comprehensively studied.

The first one-name conference was held at the Grand Hotel in Leicester from 13 to 14 May 1978. Sixty-six participants attended the inaugural conference. A formal resolution was carried unanimously to establish a Guild of individuals engaged in one-name research. The Guild was officially launched in Plymouth, Devon, on 1 September 1979 during a conference hosted by the family history societies of Devon and Cornwall. Within a few months, approximately 200 members had enrolled in the Guild. To qualify for registration, one needed to have a significant body of data relating to the given surname and its variants. It was suggested that entries be extracted from current telephone directories, civil registration indexes of births, marriages and deaths, and national probate indexes such as the Prerogative Courts of Canterbury and York.

The decision to call it a guild was partly inspired by the notion that medieval guilds had encouraged professionalism along with mutual aid, as well as by a whimsical desire to create the acronym GOONS, evoking a popular British radio humorous show, The Goon Show, and making a self-mocking comment on the quixotic nature of one-name studies.

As a small organisation, the Guild has no employed staff. It has co-operated closely with the Halsted Trust, created by legacy, which promotes one-name studies.

While one-name studies have been popular in Britain thanks to that country's unified and open vital records, the Guild has maintained that studies it recognises should be worldwide in scope and has provide guidance for non-British studies in its methodological advice.

== One-name studies ==
A one-name study is a project researching all occurrences of a surname, as opposed to a particular pedigree (ancestors of one person) or descendancy (descendants of one person or couple). Some "one-namers" may restrict their research geographically, perhaps to one country, but to register a surname with the Guild a member must commit to researching on a world-wide basis.

Typically, the researchers will also study the etymology of the surname, and its geographical distribution. Sometimes, especially if the surname is also a place name, they will try to identify the place or places of origin of the surname, employing the normal methods of genealogy.

A small core of Guild members are combining their traditional documentary research with a DNA project. By the end of 2009 some 200 DNA surname projects were led by Guild members.

One-name study researchers are also increasingly making use of online networking services such as Facebook to make connections with other people researching their surname.

== Activities ==
The principal meeting places of the Guild are its on-line mailing list – the Guild Email Forum, an active Members only Facebook Group and its Seminars and Annual Conferences, which are mostly held in England. There is also a Facebook page which non-members can view and contact the Guild. As an organisation, its principal role has been to debate and distribute advice on methods for one-name studies. Members have collated a wiki of such advice, but this is not yet publicly available.

To meet the concern of members that one-name compilations are often lost to posterity when researchers die and their papers are destroyed, the Guild Archive, an electronic repository for members' one-name records, has been created and guidelines laid down on bequests of digital data to the Guild.

The Guild Marriage Index, a facility to help members find the names of marriage partners and identify from index numbers where post-1837 marriages took place in England and Wales, is likely to become the Guild's main contribution to the wider field of family history.

== Publications ==
The Guild's initial periodical was the Guild of One-Name Studies Newsletter, published quarterly for eight issues from January 1980 to October 1981 on corner-stapled, typescript foolscap sheets under editor Frank Higenbottam.

This was followed by the Journal of One-Name Studies, with binding, also quarterly, from 1982 to the present. Its current editor (2016-) is Jean-Marc Bazzoni.The Register of One-Name Studies published annually, lists all one-name studies currently registered by Guild members. The Guild also publishes booklets of advice such as Organising a One-Name Gathering. The Guild published Your Research Surname Guide - How to do a One-Name Study with the April 2019 edition of Family Tree Magazine (UK).

In September 2019, the Guild published a revised and extended edition, called Researching Surnames - A Guide to One-Name Studies, both of these guides were written by Julie Goucher.

== Membership ==
Membership of the Guild is open to anyone interested in one-name studies. Members may register their one-name study surnames with the Guild if they wish, provided those surnames are not currently registered. However registration of a surname is not a condition of membership.

At its foundation, the Guild had about 200 members. At present (2022), it has 2,516 members. Study surnames are listed in a Register of One-Name Studies, published both on-line and on paper. The Register shows that slightly more than 2,300 studies are being conducted involving a total of about 8,200 surnames and variants. A considerable number of early members have retired or died, and their studies, additional to this number, have therefore ceased – though the Guild offers all members the possibility of preserving their research materials.

Some 20 per cent of the membership present their findings through websites. Guild members can also publicise their studies through profiles created on the Guild's website. As an indicator of digitised methods, 80 per cent of the members have an e-mail address registered with the Guild.

The addresses of members show the bulk to be living in Britain, but with significant numbers in North America, Australia and New Zealand.

== See also ==
- Extinction of surnames
