= Common misunderstandings of genetics =

Public misconceptions about genetic science

During the latter half of the 20th century, the fields of genetics and molecular biology matured greatly, significantly increasing understanding of biological heredity. As with other complex and evolving fields of knowledge, the public awareness of these advances has primarily been through the mass media, and a number of common misunderstandings of genetics have arisen.

== Genetic determinism ==
It is a popular misconception that all patterns of an animal's behaviour, and more generally its phenotype, are rigidly determined by its genes. Although many examples of animals exist that display certain well-defined behaviour that is genetically programmed, these examples cannot be extrapolated to all animal behaviour. There is good evidence that some basic aspects of human behaviour, such as circadian rhythms are genetically based, but it is clear that many other aspects are not.

In the first place, much phenotypic variability does not stem from genes themselves. For example:

1. Epigenetic inheritance. In the widest definition this includes all biological inheritance mechanisms that do not change the DNA sequence of the genome. In a narrower definition it excludes biological phenomena such as the effects of prions and maternal antibodies which are also inherited and have clear survival implications.
2. Learning from experience. This feature is obviously important for humans, but there is considerable evidence of learned behaviour in other animal species (vertebrates and invertebrates). There are even reports of learned behaviour in Drosophila larvae.

== A gene for X ==
In the early years of genetics it was suggested that there might be "a gene for" a wide range of particular characteristics. This was partly because the examples studied from Mendel onwards inevitably focused on genes whose effects could be readily identified; partly that it was easier to teach science that way; and partly because the mathematics of evolutionary dynamics is simpler if there is a simple mapping between genes and phenotypic characteristics.

These have led to the general perception that there is "a gene for" arbitrary traits, leading to controversy in particular cases such as the purported "gay gene". However, in light of the known complexities of gene expression networks (and phenomena such as epigenetics), it is clear that instances where a single gene "codes for" a single, discernible phenotypic effect are rare, and that media presentations of "a gene for X" grossly oversimplify the vast majority of situations.

== Genes as a blueprint ==
It is widely believed that genes provide a "blueprint" for the body in much the same way that architectural or mechanical engineering blueprints describe buildings or machines. At a superficial level, genes and conventional blueprints share the common property of being low dimensional (genes are organised as a one-dimensional string of nucleotides; blueprints are typically two-dimensional drawings on paper) but containing information about fully three-dimensional structures. However, this view ignores the fundamental differences between genes and blueprints in the nature of the mapping from low order information to the high order object.

In the case of biological systems, a long and complicated chain of interactions separates genetic information from macroscopic structures and functions. The following simplified diagram of causality illustrates this:

Genes → Gene expression → Proteins → Metabolic pathways → Sub-cellular structures → Cells → Tissues → Organs → Organisms

Even at the small scale, the relationship between genes and proteins (once thought of as "one gene, one polypeptide") is more complicated, because of alternative splicing.

Also, the causal chains from genes to functionality are not separate or isolated but are entangled together, most obviously in metabolic pathways (such as the Calvin and citric acid cycles) which link a succession of enzymes (and, thus, gene products) to form a coherent biochemical system. Furthermore, information flow in the chain is not exclusively one-way. While the central dogma of molecular biology describes how information cannot be passed back to inheritable genetic information, the other causal arrows in this chain can be bidirectional, with complex feedbacks ultimately regulating gene expression.

Instead of being a simple, linear mapping, this complex relationship between genotype and phenotype is not straightforward to decode. Rather than describing genetic information as a blueprint, some have suggested that a more appropriate analogy is that of a recipe for cooking, where a collection of ingredients is combined via a set of instructions to form an emergent structure, such as a cake, that is not described explicitly in the recipe itself.

== Genes as words ==
This stylistic schematic diagram shows a gene in relation to the double helix structure of DNA and to a chromosome (right). Introns are regions often found in eukaryote genes which are removed in the splicing process: only the exons encode the protein. This diagram labels a region of only 40 or so bases as a gene. In reality most genes are hundreds of times larger and have several introns, sometimes over 100.

It is popularly supposed that a gene is "a linear sequence of nucleotides along a segment of DNA that provides the coded instructions for synthesis of RNA" and even some current medical dictionaries define a gene as "a hereditary unit that occupies a specific location on a chromosome, determines a particular characteristic in an organism by directing the formation of a specific protein, and is capable of replicating itself at each cell division."

In fact, as the diagram illustrates schematically, genes are much more complicated and elusive concepts. A reasonable modern definition of a gene is "a locatable region of genomic sequence, corresponding to a unit of inheritance, which is associated with regulatory regions, transcribed regions and/or other functional sequence regions."

This kind of misperception is perpetuated when mainstream media report that an organism's genome has been "deciphered" when they mean that it has simply been sequenced.

== Ancestry and ethnicity ==
Genetic ancestry tests advertised by companies such as 23andMe and AncestryDNA do not actually reveal a person's geographical ancestral origins or determine their race and ethnicity. They estimate the genetic ancestry and population group of a certain person. They compare a person's DNA markers to that of modern populations collected in a company's database. A person's DNA markers being matched to a particular location does not necessarily indicate that their ancestors are from that location, due to the fact human populations have migrated all throughout history, and the geopolitical borders of modern nations are not the same as they were in the past. There are no genes that are unique to specific ethnic groups, as ethnic groups are created by human society rather than genetics. The actual genetic variation that exists among humans does not correlate with socially defined ethnic and racial categories, yet there are patterns of genetic variation in some population groups that are more common than others. Genetic ancestry is distinct from genealogical ancestry; as an individual's genealogical ancestors become more distant, they will become less genetically related to those ancestors, and a greater number of other individuals across the world will share those same ancestors. These tests can be used for specific connections and cases like detecting a close relative. Underrepresented populations may not receive as accurate results if the company has less data on their group, although as the technology improves with tools like mid-pass whole genome sequencing this will likely change and improve.
