= Surname DNA project =

Using DNA tests to trace male lineage

A surname DNA project is a genetic genealogy project which uses genealogical DNA tests to trace male lineage.

In most cultures, there are few or no matrilineal surnames, or matrinames, so there are still few or no matrilineal surname projects. However, DNA tests are equally important for the two sexes (see genealogical DNA test).

Because surnames are passed down from father to son in many cultures (patrilineal), and Y-chromosomes (Y-DNA) are passed from father to son with a predictable rate of mutation, people with the same surname can use genealogical DNA testing to determine if they share a common ancestor within recent history.

When two males share a surname, a test of their Y-chromosome markers will determine either that they are not related, or that they are related. If they are related, the number of markers tested and the number of matches at those markers determines the range of generations until their most recent common ancestor (MRCA). If the two tests match on 37 markers, there is a 90% probability that the MRCA was less than five generations ago and a 95% probability that the MRCA was less than eight generations ago.

== Markers ==
A Y-DNA test ranges from 10 to 111 markers on the Y chromosome. Most surname projects suggest at least 25 markers. Test results tell how many repeats a given subject has at a particular marker; the variations of repeats are known as alleles. For example, at DYS455, the results will normally show 8, 9, 10, 11, or 12 repeats. The specific test results for a given individual are referred to as a haplotype. When a surname project has enough participants' test results, it can group similar test results together and determine a modal haplotype for each such group of similar test results.

== Testing companies ==
Surname projects are now being hosted by testing companies. Some labs even store the submitted samples for a number of years, enabling additional tests to be performed as they become available. By far the largest collection of Y-DNA test results is maintained by Family Tree DNA, including many surname projects that make direct use of those results.

== Haplogroups ==
The Y chromosome has been studied intensely and variations have been divided into Human Y-chromosome DNA haplogroups, based upon the results of the number of alleles in certain positions called markers. These "markers" have been chosen for their demonstrated ability to predict the haplogroup of the tested individual. Each testing company used a different set, although many are overlapping. This had allowed Y-STR database websites such as Ybase and Ysearch (both now defunct) to convert scores from several companies and find matches within their database for submitted results.

== See also ==
- One-name study
- Extinction of surnames
