= Sorenson Molecular Genealogy Foundation =

DNA and genealogical research institution

Coordinates: 40.71658°N 111.8917°W

The Sorenson Molecular Genealogy Foundation (SMGF) was an independent DNA and genealogical research institution with the goal of demonstrating how the peoples of the world are related. SMGF collected DNA samples and genealogical information from individuals across the globe to establish these connections.

== History ==
SMGF originated in 1999 and was inspired by several conversations between inventor and philanthropist James LeVoy Sorenson and Brigham Young University professor Dr. Scott Woodward. Mr. Sorenson envisioned the development of a genetic-genealogical blueprint of all humankind. This blueprint, as developed by Dr. Woodward, would show how closely humans are related to one another, demonstrating the familial relationships between unique individuals. The collection of DNA samples and associated family pedigrees began in 2000, beginning first with Brigham Young University students, and quickly branching outside of Utah, then to the rest of the world.

In 2003, SMGF moved its operations from the Brigham Young University campus to Salt Lake City. SMGF also outsourced all of its laboratory work to Sorenson Genomics, freeing researchers to create a publicly available online repository. This repository was known as the Sorenson Database.

SMGF collected more than 100,000 DNA samples and familial pedigrees from donors around the world, all of which were available in the Sorenson Database. This database was acquired by Ancestry.com prior to its launch of AncestryDNA when they purchased GeneTree in 2012. Genetree was SMGF's commercial arm.

== Sorenson Database ==
The Sorenson Database contained more than 100,000 DNA samples and familial pedigrees, encompassing 2.8 million genealogical records and 2.4 million genotypes.

The Sorenson Database matched genetic information with familial surnames. A person searching through the database was able to find both genetic and genealogical matches, but could search using either DNA haplotypes or familial surname. The average family pedigree contained six generations of pedigree information (more than 150 years) with over 6 million genetically linked ancestors.

There were only two areas for individuals to search within the Sorenson Database, a Y chromosome database and a mitochondrial DNA database. The Y-DNA database allowed males to search their direct paternal line; the mtDNA database allowed both males and females search their direct maternal line. According to ISOGG.org, Sorenson "also had large X chromosome and autosomal STR databases, but these databases were never made publicly available."

Y-chromosome Database:

The Y chromosome is passed on from father to son with little changes to Y-DNA. Surnames also tend to generally be passed on from father to son. The Sorenson Database used Y-chromosome genetic markers and surnames to determine common ancestors. Users could share DNA results and pedigree charts obtained from other sources. They could search for ancestors using their surname, genetic marker values obtained through their DNA analysis, or a combination of the two. The database also had genetic marker default values if users did not have their own genetic information.

A Y-DNA test analyzes similarities in Y-chromosome DNA markers, corresponding to specific locations on the Y chromosome. Markers have a Short tandem repeat (STR) that involve repeats of 2–5 DNA base pairs. At Sorenson labs, the number of STRs in a 36-marker haplotype was compared between the sample given and the database to determine relatedness. The Single-nucleotide polymorphism (SNP) was also examined. Y-chromosome SNPs are rare and can be used to separate populations of men or haplogroups and can be used in population studies.

Mitochondrial Database:

Both males and females inherit their mitochondrial DNA (mtDNA) from their mother, which allows mtDNA to determine a maternal line. The Sorenson Database compared mitochondrial DNA from over 76, 000 people in their mitochondrial database to find cousins connected across generations. Users could share their mtDNA results from other commercial labs.

The mtDNA test examines three regions of the D-loop of mtDNA: HVR1, HVR2 and HVR3 which is called the Hypervariable region. Mutations in these areas of mtDNA are extremely rare and have likely not changed between maternal-line cousins within the last 500 years. Therefore, looking at mutations in these areas can determine maternal lineages. Samples of mtDNA submitted to the Sorenson Molecular Genealogy Foundation were compared to the Cambridge Reference Sequence (CRS) of mtDNA then to each other for relatedness.

== Participation ==
One of the perhaps overly ambitious missions of SMGF was to connect any two individuals in the world, showing to both how they are related. In order to accomplish this goal, SMGF collected DNA samples and correlated familial pedigrees from participants around the world. After reaching their 100,000 sample goal, SMGF modified their goals to focus less on collecting new samples and more on analysis of previous samples.

New participants were still accepted through SMGF's subsidiary, GeneTree for many years. Also, previous SMGF participants could buy their DNA report through GeneTree.com.

Another goal of SMGF was to advance research in the scientific field of molecular genealogy. SMGF conducted research to identify additional DNA markers which link an individual to their genealogical family, however direct or distant. SMGF researchers published a number of research papers, many of which involved collaborations with other researchers.

DNA collection for the project initially involved drawing blood samples; since August 2002, the SMGF used a mouthwash-based collection method (GenetiRinse), which has the advantage that it can be mailed to participants living in remote areas.

== Controversy and Shutdown ==
In May 2015, Ancestry.com took down the SMGF website, citing that "the site has been used for purposes other than what was intended, forcing [Ancestry.com] to cease operations on the site." The action by Ancestry.com was taken in response to news revelations claiming that the SMGF database had been used by Ancestry.com and local law enforcement, without any court oversight [e.g., a warrant] and in violation of SMGF's privacy policy, to try to tie criminal suspects to crime scenes. Although the actions in the case by all parties, particularly Ancestry.com and the local law enforcement, were eventually recognized to have followed proper constitutional procedures of privacy protection and court oversight in the case, the scandal significantly impacted Ancestry.com's reputation and led to the decision to deactivate the website and mothball the SMGF database.
