= Scott Woodward (biologist) =

American microbiologist

Scott Ray Woodward is a microbiologist and molecular biologist who specializes in genetic genealogy and ancient DNA studies. He was a professor at Brigham Young University (BYU) from 1989 to 2003. He was the president and principal investigator for the Sorenson Molecular Genealogy Foundation between 2005 and 2012, and the chief scientific officer from 2007 to 2012 at Genetree. He was the executive director of Genomic Study at Ancestry.com from 2012 to 2015. Since 2012 he has also taught at Utah Valley University. He is a member of the Church of Jesus Christ of Latter-day Saints (LDS Church).

Woodward graduated from the College of Eastern Utah in 1978. He received his Ph.D. from the Utah State University, where he studied under Eldon Gardner. In 1989, he was made a professor at BYU. Early in his research career, he did DNA studies on Egyptian mummies and the Dead Sea Scrolls. He also led a team that worked to decipher dinosaur DNA. He was involved in the discovery of the first genetic marker for cystic fibrosis.

In 1991, Woodward was one of the BYU professors who suggested that students be banned from driving cars to campus.

In 1994, Woodward announced that he had extracted and typed DNA from an 80-million-year-old Cretaceous dinosaur bone, but S. Blair Hedges and other experts on ancient DNA demonstrated that Woodward had really sequenced human DNA.

Woodward was a visiting professor at the Hebrew University of Jerusalem in 1994–1995.

== Sources ==
- "Extracting Mummy DNA". Secrets of the Pharaohs. PBS. Archived from the original on April 16, 2001.
- "Scott R. Woodward, Seminar at USU". Mormon Apologetics & Discussion Board. May 16, 2004.
