= Genographic Project =

Citizen science project

Genographic Project

The Genographic Project, launched on April 13th, 2005 by the National Geographic Society and IBM, was a genetic anthropological study that aimed to map historical human migrations patterns by collecting and analyzing DNA samples.

The final phase of the project was Geno 2.0 Next Generation.

The project and website was discontinued in June of 2020. Upon retirement of the site, 1,006,543 participants in over 140 countries had joined the project.

The Genographic Project faced criticisms from Indigenous awareness organizations such as the Indigenous Peoples Council on Biocolonialism (IPCB) and the United Nations Permanent Forum on Indigenous Issues (UNPFII).

== Project history ==
=== Beginnings ===
In 2005, project director Spencer Wells created and then led the Genographic Project, which was a privately funded, not-for-profit collaboration among the National Geographic Society, IBM, and the Waitt Foundation. Field researchers at eleven regional centers around the world began by collecting DNA samples from indigenous populations.

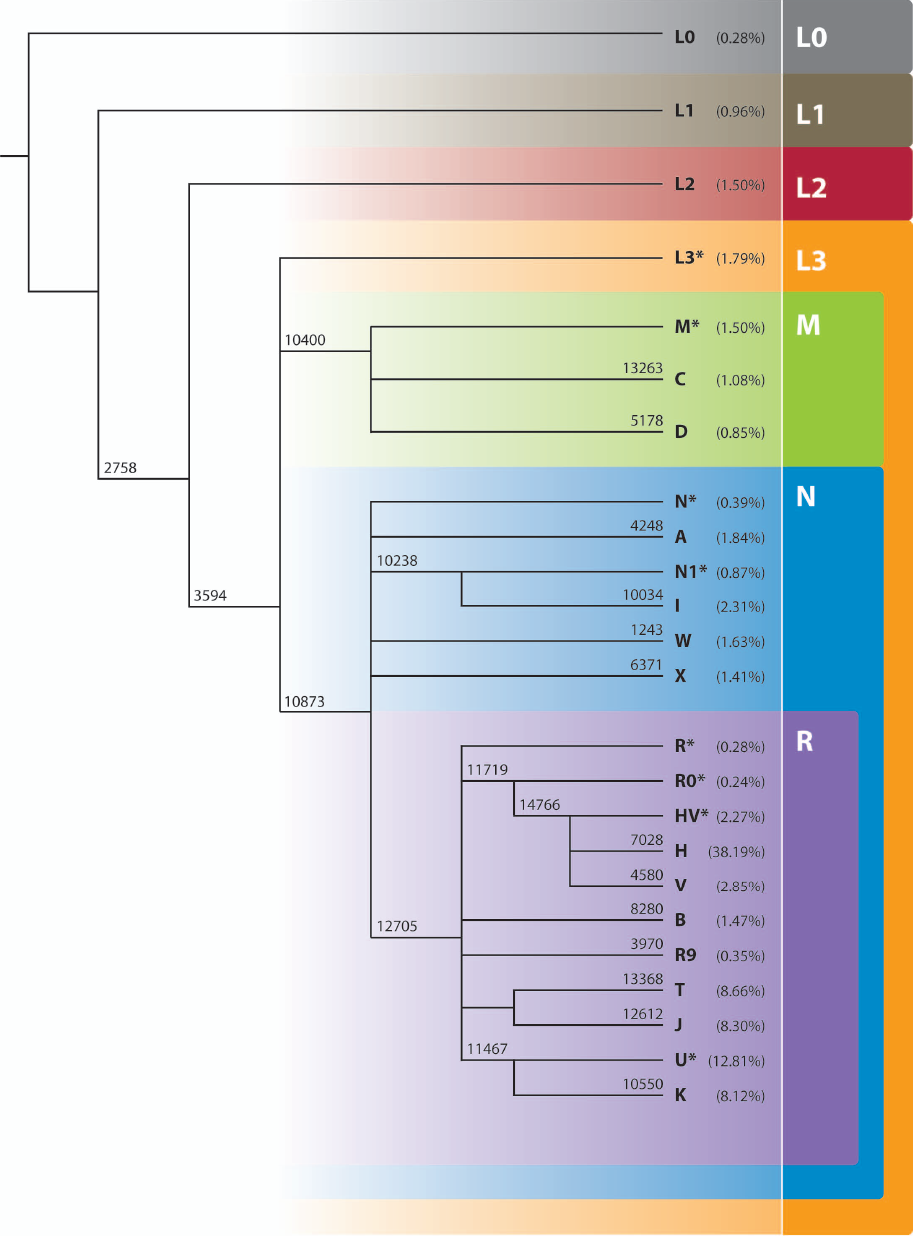
Phylogeny of mitochondrial DNA haplogroups (2007).

In the fall of 2012, the Genographic Project announced the completion of a new genotyping array, dedicated to genetic anthropology, called GenoChip. GenoChip was specifically designed for anthropological testing and included SNPs from autosomal DNA, X-chromosome DNA, Y-chromosome DNA, and mitochondrial DNA (mtDNA). The design of the new chip was a collaborative effort among Wells of National Geographic, Eran Elhaik of Johns Hopkins, Family Tree DNA, and Illumina.

The autosomal admixture analysis developed by Wells and Elhaik classified individuals by assessing their proportions of genomic ancestry related to nine ancestral regions: Northeast Asian; Mediterranean; Southern African; Southwest Asian; Oceanian; Southeast Asian; Northern European; Sub-Saharan African; and Native American.

In August of 2015, a new chip was designed as a joint effort between Vilar, who was the Genographic Lead Scientist, and Family Tree DNA.

In the fall of 2015, Miguel Vilar took over leadership of the Project.

=== Geno 2.0 Next Generation ===
In 2016, the project began utilizing cutting-edge Helix DNA sequencing for a new phase of the Genographic Project called Geno 2.0 Next Generation.

Whereas earlier phases used 9 regional affiliations, Geno 2.0 Next Generation analyzed modern-day indigenous populations around the world using either 18 or 22 regional affiliations.

Utilizing a DNA-collection kit, Helix would acquire a saliva sample from a participant, which would then be analyzed for genomic identifiers that were designed to offer unprecedented insight into a person's genetic origins. The data would then be uploaded to the Genographic Project DNA database.

Population	Mediterranean	Northern European	Southwest Asian	Sub-Saharan African	Southern African	Northeast Asian	Southeast Asian	Native American	Oceanian	Total
Altaian	2	17	22			53		4		98
Amerindian (Mexico)	4	5	3			4		83		99
Bermudian	15	20	7	48	3		7	4		100
British	33	50	17							100
Bulgarian	47	31	20			2				100
Chinese						72	28			100
Danish	30	53	16							99
Dominican	29	11	1	47	1	1	1	4		95
Eastern Indian	2	2	43				50		2	99
Egyptian	65		18	14						97
Finnish	17	57	17			7				98
Georgian	61	7	31							99
German	36	46	17							99
Greek	54	28	17							99
Iberian	48	37	13							98
Iranian	42	8	42			5				97
Japanese						75	25			100
Khoisan				47	52					99
Kinh						57	43			100
Kuwaiti	57	4	27	8		2				98
Lebanese	66	5	26	2						99
Luhya	2			89	8					99
Malagasy	2			57	4	15	20			98
Mexican	28	20	8	4			2	36		98
Mongolian		2	7			76	10	5		100
Northern Caucasian	46	16	33			4				99
Northern Indian	6	5	34			26	27			98
Oceanian							12		88	100
Papuan						5	4		91	100
Highland Peruvian	2	2						95		99
Peruvians	15	10	3	2				68		98
Puerto Rican	31	21	9	25	2			11		99
Romanian	43	36	19			2				100
Russians	25	51	18			4				98
Sardinian	67	24	8							99
Southern Indian	4	2	58				35			99
Tajikistan	22	22	44			10				98
Tatar	21	40	21			16				98
Tunisian	62	6	10	19			2			99
Tuscan	54	28	17							99
Vanuatu						4	15		78	97
Western Indian	9	6	58				26			99
Yoruba people				97	3					100

Reference Populations Next-Gen based on Biogeographical Ancestry
Population	Arabia	Asia Minor	Central Asia	Eastern Africa	Eastern Europe	Great Britain & Ireland	Jewish Diaspora	Northern Africa	Southern Africa	Southern Asia	Southwest Asia & Persian Gulf	Southern Europe	Western & Central Africa
African-American (Southwestern USA)				2%		4%			9%			3%	81%
Egyptian		3%		3%			4%	68%			17%	3%	
Ethiopian	11%			64%				5%	7%	8%			5%
Greek		9%			7%		2%	2%				79%	
Iranian	56%	6%	4%	4%				2%		24%		2%	
Kuwaiti		7%		3%				4%			84%		
Luhya (Kenyan)				81%				4%	4%	4%	2%		5%
Tunisian								88%			4%	5%	2%
Yoruban (West African)				2%				3%	6%				89%

=== Endings ===
On May 31st, 2019, the National Geographic Society stopped selling Genographic Project kits. There was no reason provided. National Geographic stopped processing samples after January 1st, 2020 and all kits received after this date were destroyed.

Users who completed and processed their kits before January 1st, 2020 were able to access their results on the Genographic Project website until June 30th, 2020. The website was discontinued after this date.

== Legacy ==
Genographic Project public participation.

For the duration of the initiative, from 2005 to 2019, Genographic engaged volunteers (in fieldwork and providing DNA samples) and citizen science projects. During this time the National Geographic Society sold non-profit self-testing kits to members of the general public who wished to participate in the project as "citizen scientists". Such outreach for public participation in research has been encouraged by organizations such as International Society of Genetic Genealogy (ISOGG), which is seeking to promote benefits from scientific research. This includes supporting, organization and dissemination of personal DNA (genetic) testing.

The ISOGG has supported citizen participation in genetic research, and believes such volunteers have provided valuable information and research to the professional scientific community.

In 2013, Spencer Wells gave a speech to the Southern California Genealogical Society, in which he highlighted its encouragement of citizen scientists:

Since 2005, the Genographic Project has used the latest genetic technology to expand our knowledge of the human story, and its pioneering use of DNA testing to engage and involve the public in the research effort has helped to create a new breed of "citizen scientist". Geno 2.0 expands the scope for citizen science, harnessing the power of the crowd to discover new details of human population history.

== Criticism ==
In April 2005, shortly after the announcement of the project, the Indigenous Peoples Council on Biocolonialism (IPCB) noted its connections to controversial issues (such as concerns that the results of genetic human migration studies might indicate that Native Americans are not indigenous to North America). The IPCB recommended against indigenous people participating.

According to Debra Harry, founder of the IPCB, the Genographic Project resulted in a human genetic testing practice that appeared to mask an ulterior motive rather than mere scientific research. The possible political interest behind the Genographic Project motivated the IPCB to alert the global indigenous community on the "not so altruistic motivations" of the project. Additionally, the IPCB argued that the Genographic Project not only provided no direct benefit to Indigenous peoples, but instead raised considerable risks. Such risks were used to advocate against the indigenous participation in the project.

Harry also argued that the Genographic Project served as a method to discredit kin relations. Ancestral identities might be invalidated and misused to deny Indigenous peoples’ access and authority over the resource-rich territories that they had for long inhabited.

Kim TallBear, a scholar whose research focuses on racial politics within science, raises similar points as Harry. She also expressed that another possible negative consequence is the risk that an individual's cultural identity would be conclusively established through biocolonialist projects such as the Genographic Project.

In May 2006, the project came to the attention of the United Nations Permanent Forum on Indigenous Issues (UNPFII). UNPFII conducted investigations into the objectives of the Genographic Project, and recommended that National Geographic and other sponsors suspend the project. Concerns were that the knowledge gleaned from the research could clash with long-held beliefs of indigenous peoples and threaten their cultures. There were also concerns that indigenous claims to land rights and other resources could be threatened.

As of December 2006, some federally recognized tribes in the United States declined to take part in the study including Maurice Foxx, chairman of the Massachusetts Commission on Indian Affairs and a member of the Mashpee Wampanoag.

Not all Indigenous peoples agree with his position; as of December 2012, more than 70,000 indigenous participants from the Americas, Africa, Asia, Europe, and Oceania had joined the project.

== See also ==
- Genealogical DNA test – DNA-based genetic test
- Genetic diversity – Total number of genetic characteristics in a species
- Human genetic variation – Genetic diversity in human populations
- Human genetics – Study of inheritance as it occurs in human beings
- Human migration – Movement of people for their benefit
- Human mitochondrial DNA haplogroups – Haplogroup defined by differences in human mitochondrial DNA
- Human Y-chromosome DNA haplogroups – Human DNA groupings
- Mitochondrial Eve – Matrilineal most recent common ancestor of all living humans
- Personal Genomics – Branch of genomics concerned with the genome of an individual
- Y-chromosomal Adam – Patrilineal most recent common ancestor of all living humans
- Y-chromosome haplogroups in populations of the world

== Bibliography ==
=== News articles ===
- "Finding the roots of modern humans". CNN. 14 April 2005.
- "'Genographic Project' aims to tell us where we came from". USA Today. 17 April 2005.
- "Indigenous Peoples Oppose National Geographic", Indigenous Peoples Council on Biocolonialism, 13 April 2005.
- "Tracking the Truth", DB2 Magazine (IBM), information about IBM's role in the project. December 2006.
- Genographic Success Stories
- "Crusaders left genetic legacy". BBC News. 27 March 2008.
- "Human Line 'Nearly split in Two'". BBC News. 24 April 2008.
