= Living DNA =

British DNA testing company

- Company type: Private
- Industry: Online services Genetic testing
- Founded: September 2016; 9 years ago
- Headquarters: Frome, Somerset, England
- Key people: David Nicholson (CEO, co-founder); Hannah Morden-Nicholson (Co-founder)
- Website: www.livingdna.com

Living DNA is a UK-based company that specialises in DNA testing and analysis whose head office is in the UK with facilities in the USA and Denmark. The company conducts three types of DNA analyses: autosomal, Y-chromosome and mitochrondrial.

== History and partnership ==
In 2016, Living DNA was co-founded by Tricia Nicholson and husband-and-wife team, David Nicholson and Hannah Morden-Nicholson, in Frome, Somerset, England. The company began after extensive research and work along with a team of around 100 genealogists around the world. In 1999 Nicholson founded another company, DNA Worldwide, which he has been running since.

In July 2018, Living DNA announced and signed a partnership agreement with Findmypast, also a British genealogy company. By working together, their mission was to provide an extensive and detailed family roots and history. Unfortunately, this partnership ended in 2023.

In 2019, Living DNA was reported to provide, for each DNA sample tested, recent (less than 80,00 years) ethnic breakdown for 80 regions in the world with the UK broken down in to 21 regions. They also provided insight into female and paternal (for males) heritage going back about 200,000 years showing migration patterns out of Africa.

== DNA privacy concerns ==
Research published in 2020 in the scientific journal eLife by geneticist Michael Edge from the University of California uncovered security concerns when customers upload DNA from other services to smaller genealogy companies, including Living DNA. Larger companies do not allow users to upload their data. It was found that hackers using creative means could easily exploit the upload process.. Biostatistician Sharon Browning from the University of Washington said that if consumers "care about their DNA's privacy, then they shouldn't upload [their DNA] to these databases."

== Critics and reviews ==
Living DNA is a consumer genetic testing company that provides ancestry and genealogical analysis. Public reviews are largely negative, though some users report positive experiences. The company’s database contains fewer than 300,000 samples, which may limit the scope and precision of its ethnicity estimates and DNA matching services compared to larger competitors.

By contrast, companies such as AncestryDNA and 23andMe maintain substantially larger databases, which are generally associated with more extensive genetic match networks and refined ancestry reports.
