= Buccal swab =

DNA collection from inside a person's cheek

A buccal swab, also known as buccal smear, is a way to collect DNA from the cells on the inside of a person's cheek. Buccal swabs are a relatively non-invasive way to collect DNA samples for testing. Buccal means cheek or mouth. It is very common in clinical trials and in law enforcement investigations where it can include or exclude individuals as suspects.
