= Haplotype 35 =

In human genetics, Haplotype 35, also called ht35 or the Armenian Modal Haplotype, is a Y chromosome haplotype of Y-STR microsatellite variations, associated with the Haplogroup R1b. It is characterized by DYS393=12 (as opposed to the Atlantic Modal Haplotype, another R1b haplotype, which is characterized by DYS393=13). The members of this haplotype are found in high numbers in Anatolia and Armenia, with smaller numbers throughout Central Asia, the Middle East, the Balkans, the Caucus Mountains, and in Jewish populations. They are also present in Britain in areas that were found to have a high concentration of Haplogroup J, suggesting they arrived together, perhaps through Roman soldiers.

== See also ==
- Modal haplotype
- Haplotype
- Haplogroup
- Haplogroup R1b
- List of Y-STR markers
