= Repyevka =

Repyevka (Russian: Репьевка) or Repyovka (Репьёвка) is the name of several rural localities in Russia.

== Republic of Bashkortostan ==
As of 2010, two rural localities in the Republic of Bashkortostan bear this name:

- Repyevka, Belebeyevsky District, Republic of Bashkortostan, a village in Tuzlukushevsky Selsoviet of Belebeyevsky District
- Repyevka, Chishminsky District, Republic of Bashkortostan, a village in Ibragimovsky Selsoviet of Chishminsky District

== Belgorod Oblast ==
As of 2010, one rural locality in Belgorod Oblast bears this name:

- Repyevka, Belgorod Oblast, a selo in Repyevsky Rural Okrug of Volokonovsky District

== Kursk Oblast ==
As of 2010, one rural locality in Kursk Oblast bears this name:

- Repyevka, Kursk Oblast, a village in Pogozhensky Selsoviet of Timsky District

== Republic of Mordovia ==
As of 2010, three rural localities in the Republic of Mordovia bear this name:

- Repyevka, Chamzinsky District, Republic of Mordovia, a selo under the administrative jurisdiction of Chamzinka Work Settlement in Chamzinsky District
- Repyevka, Ichalkovsky District, Republic of Mordovia, a village in Permeyevsky Selsoviet of Ichalkovsky District
- Repyevka, Lyambirsky District, Republic of Mordovia, a selo in Salovsky Selsoviet of Lyambirsky District

== Orenburg Oblast ==
As of 2010, one rural locality in Orenburg Oblast bears this name:

- Repyevka, Orenburg Oblast, a selo in Repyevsky Selsoviet of Tyulgansky District

== Oryol Oblast ==
As of 2010, one rural locality in Oryol Oblast bears this name:

- Repyevka, Oryol Oblast, a village in Oktyabrsky Selsoviet of Maloarkhangelsky District

== Penza Oblast ==
As of 2010, one rural locality in Penza Oblast bears this name:

- Repyevka, Penza Oblast, a selo in Dolgorukovsky Selsoviet of Serdobsky District

== Samara Oblast ==
As of 2010, one rural locality in Samara Oblast bears this name:

- Repyevka, Samara Oblast, a selo in Kinel-Cherkassky District

== Saratov Oblast ==
As of 2010, two rural localities in Saratov Oblast bear this name:

- Repyevka, Bazarno-Karabulaksky District, Saratov Oblast, a selo in Bazarno-Karabulaksky District
- Repyevka, Rtishchevsky District, Saratov Oblast, a selo in Rtishchevsky District

== Tambov Oblast ==
As of 2010, one rural locality in Tambov Oblast bears this name:

- Repyevka, Tambov Oblast, a settlement in Kalaissky Selsoviet of Kirsanovsky District

== Republic of Tatarstan ==
As of 2010, one rural locality in the Republic of Tatarstan bears this name:

- Repyevka, Republic of Tatarstan, a settlement in Kaybitsky District

== Ulyanovsk Oblast ==
As of 2010, three rural localities in Ulyanovsk Oblast bear this name:

- Repyevka, Inzensky District, Ulyanovsk Oblast, a selo in Cheremushkinsky Rural Okrug of Inzensky District
- Repyevka (selo), Novospassky District, Ulyanovsk Oblast, a selo in Krasnoselsky Rural Okrug of Novospassky District
- Repyevka (station), Novospassky District, Ulyanovsk Oblast, a station in Krasnoselsky Rural Okrug of Novospassky District

== Voronezh Oblast ==
As of 2010, one rural locality in Voronezh Oblast bears this name:

- Repyovka, Voronezh Oblast, a selo in Repyovskoye Rural Settlement of Repyovsky District
