= Haplogroup R1b =

Type of paternal lineage

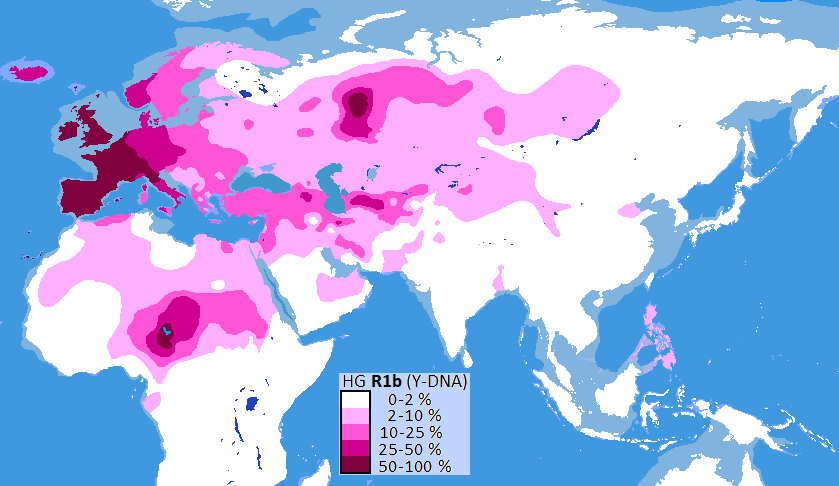
- Possible time of origin: Probably soon after R1, possibly between 18,000-14,000 BC
- Possible place of origin: Western Asia, North Eurasia or Eastern Europe
- Ancestor: R1
- Descendants: R1b1a (L754, PF6269, YSC0000022); R1b2 (PH155)
- Defining mutations: M343

Haplogroup R1b (R-M343), previously known as Hg1 and Eu18, is a human Y-chromosome haplogroup.

It is the most frequently occurring paternal lineage in Western Europe, as well as some parts of Russia (e.g. the Bashkirs) and across the Sahel in Central Africa, namely: Cameroon, Chad, Guinea, Mauritania, Mali, Niger, Nigeria and Senegal (concentrated in parts of Chad with concentration in the Hausa Tribe and among the Chadic-speaking ethnic groups of Cameroon).

The clade is also present at lower frequencies throughout Siberia, Eastern Europe, Western Asia, Central Asia as well as parts of North Africa, South Asia and Central Asia.

R1b has two primary branches: R1b1-L754 and R1b2-PH155. Where R1b1-L754 has two major subclades: R1b1a1b-M269, which predominates in Western Europe, and R1b1a2-V88, which is today common in parts of Central Africa. The other branch, R1b2-PH155, is so rare and widely dispersed that it is difficult to draw any conclusions about its origins. It has been found in Bahrain, India, Nepal, Bhutan, Ladakh, Tajikistan, Turkey, and Western China.

According to ancient DNA studies, most R1a and R1b lineages would have expanded from the Pontic Steppe along with the Indo-European languages.

== Origin and dispersal ==
Genetic studies performed since 2015 have revealed that the Yamna culture, thought to have spoken some stage of Proto-Indo-European, carried R1b-L23.

The age of R1 was estimated by Tatiana Karafet et al. (2008) at between 12,500 and 25,700 BP, and most probably occurred about 18,500 years ago. Since the earliest known example has been dated at circa 14,000 BP, and belongs to R1b1 (R-L754), R1b must have arisen relatively soon after the emergence of R1.

Early human remains found to carry R1b include:

- Villabruna 1 (individual I9030), a Western Hunter-Gatherer (WHG), found in an Epigravettian culture setting in the Cismon valley (modern Veneto, Italy), who lived circa 14000 BP and belonged to R1b1a.
- Several males of the Iron Gates Mesolithic in the Balkans buried between 11200 and 8200 BP carried R1b1a1a. These individuals were determined to be largely of WHG ancestry, with slight Eastern Hunter-Gatherer (EHG) admixture.
- Several males of the Mesolithic Kunda culture and Neolithic Narva culture buried in the Zvejnieki burial ground in modern-day Latvia c. 9500–6000 BP carried R1b1b. These individuals were determined to be largely of WHG ancestry, with slight EHG admixture.
- Several Mesolithic and Neolithic males buried at Deriivka and Vasil'evka in modern-day Ukraine c. 9500-7000 BP carried R1b1a. These individuals were largely of EHG ancestry, with significant WHG admixture.
- A WHG male buried at Ostrovul Corbului, Romania c. 8700 BP carried R1b1c.
- A male buried at Lepenski Vir, Serbia c. 8200-7900 BP carried R1b1a.
- An EHG buried near Samara, Russia 7500 BP carried R1b1a1a.
- An Eneolithic male buried at Khvalynsk, Russia c. 7200-6000 BP carried R1b1a.
- A Neolithic male buried at Els Trocs, Spain c. 7178-7066 BP, who may have belonged to the Epi-Cardial culture, was found to be a carrier of R1b1.
- A Late Chalcolithic male buried in Smyadovo, Bulgaria c. 6500 BP carried R1b1a.
- An Early Copper Age male buried in Cannas di Sotto, Carbonia, Sardinia c. 6450 BP carried R1b1b2.
- A male of the Baalberge group in Central Europe buried c. 5600 BP carried R1b1a.
- A male of the Botai culture in Central Asia buried c. 5500 BP carried R1b1a1 (R1b-M478).
- 7 males that were tested of the Yamnaya culture were all found to belong to the M269 subclade of haplogroup R1b.

R1b is a subclade within the "macro-haplogroup" K (M9), the most common group of human male lines outside of Africa. K is believed to have originated in Asia (as is the case with an even earlier ancestral haplogroup, F (F-M89). Karafet T. et al. (2014) suggested that a "rapid diversification process of K-M526 likely occurred in Southeast Asia, with subsequent westward expansions of the ancestors of haplogroups R and Q". However the oldest example of R* has been found in an Ancient North Eurasian sample from Siberia (Mal'ta boy, 24,000 years ago), and its precursor P1 has been found in another Ancient North Eurasian sample from northern Siberia (Yana RHS) dating from c. 31,600 years ago.

Three genetic studies in 2015 gave support to the Kurgan hypothesis of Marija Gimbutas regarding the Proto-Indo-European homeland. According to those studies, haplogroups R1b-M269 and R1a, now the most common in Europe (R1a is also common in South Asia) would have expanded from the West Eurasian Steppe, along with the Indo-European languages; they also detected an autosomal component present in modern Europeans which was not present in Neolithic Europeans, which would have been introduced with paternal lineages R1b and R1a, as well as Indo-European languages.

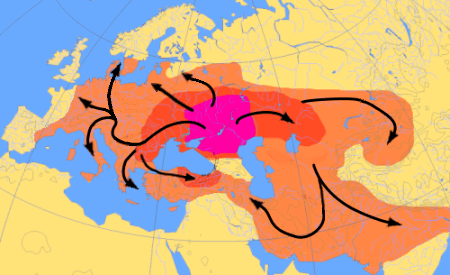
Map of Indo-European migrations from c. 4000 to 1000 BC according to the Kurgan model. The magenta area corresponds to the assumed urheimat (Samara culture, Sredny Stog culture).

Analysis of ancient Y-DNA from the remains from early Neolithic Central and North European Linear Pottery culture settlements have not yet found males belonging to haplogroup R1b-M269. Olalde et al. (2017) trace the spread of haplogroup R1b-M269 in western Europe, particularly Britain, to the spread of the Beaker culture, with a sudden appearance of many R1b-M269 haplogroups in Western Europe ca. 5000–4500 years BP during the early Bronze Age.

== Structure ==
=== External phylogeny of R1b ===
The broader haplogroup R (M207) is a primary subclade of haplogroup P1 (M45) itself a primary branch of P (P295), which is also known as haplogroup K2b2. R-M207 is therefore a secondary branch of K2b (P331), and a direct descendant of K2 (M526).

Phylogeny within K2b

- P P295/PF5866/S8 (also known as K2b2).
  - P1 M45 (a.k.a.K2b2a)
    - Q M242 (K2b2a1)
    - R M207 (K2b2a2)
      - R1 (M173)
        - R1a (M420)
        - R1b (M343)

=== Internal structure of R1b ===
Names such as R1b, R1b1 and so on are phylogenetic (i.e. "family tree") names which make clear their place within the branching of haplogroups, or the phylogenetic tree. An alternative way of naming the same haplogroups and subclades refers to their defining SNP mutations: for example, R-M343 is equivalent to R1b. Phylogenetic names change with new discoveries and SNP-based names are consequently reclassified within the phylogenetic tree. In some cases, an SNP is found to be unreliable as a defining mutation and an SNP-based name is removed completely. For example, before 2005, R1b was synonymous with R-P25, which was later reclassified as R1b1; in 2016, R-P25 was removed completely as a defining SNP, due to a significant rate of back-mutation. (Below is the basic outline of R1b according to the ISOGG Tree as it stood on January 30, 2017.)

Basic phylogenetic tree for R1b

- M343/PF6242
  - R-M343* (R1b*). No cases have been reported.
  - L278
    - PH155
      R-PH155 (R1b2) has been found in individuals from Albania, Bahrain, Bhutan, China, Germany, India, Italy, Singapore, Tajikistan, Turkey, the UK, and the USA.
    - L754/PF6269/YSC0000022
      - V88
        R-V88 (R1b1b): the most common forms of R1b found among males native to Sub-Saharan Africa, also found rarely elsewhere.
      - L389/PF6531
        - V1636
          R-V1636 (R1b1a2) is rare, but has been found in China, Bulgaria, Belarus, Southern Finland, Turkey, Iraq, Lebanon, Kuwait, Qatar, Saudi Arabia, Russia (including a Tomsk Tatar), Italy (including one from the Province of Salerno), Puerto Rico, the Dominican Republic, Canada, Germany, Valais, Israel, and Armenia.
        - P297/PF6398
          - M73
            Subclades of R-M73 (R1b1a1a) are rare overall, with most cases being observed in Siberian Tatars (especially Eushta Tatars and Baraba Tatars), Northern Altaians (especially Kumandins), some Southern Altaians (Teleuts) and Selkups in Siberia, also in Mongolia and Central Asia.
          - M269/PF6517
            Subclades of R-M269 (R1b1a1b; previously R1b1a1a2) are now extremely common throughout Western Europe, but are also found at lower levels in many other parts of Western Eurasia and the Mediterranean.

== Geographical distribution ==
=== R1b* (R-M343*) ===
No confirmed cases of R1b* (R-M343*) – that is R1b (xR1b1, R1b2), also known as R-M343 (xL754, PH155) – have been reported in peer-reviewed literature.

R-M343 (xM73, M269, V88)

In early research, because R-M269, R-M73 and R-V88 are by far the most common forms of R1b, examples of R1b (xM73, xM269) were sometimes assumed to signify basal examples of "R1b*". However, while the paragroup R-M343 (xM73, M269, V88) is rare, it does not preclude membership of rare and/or subsequently-discovered, relatively basal subclades of R1b, such as R-L278* (R1b*), R-L389* (R1b1a*), R-P297* (R1b1a1*), R-V1636 (R1b1a2) or R-PH155 (R1b2).

The population believed to have the highest proportion of R-M343 (xM73, M269, V88) are the Kurds of southeastern Kazakhstan with 13%. However, more recently, a large study of Y-chromosome variation in Iran, revealed R-M343 (xV88, M73, M269) as high as 4.3% among Iranian sub-populations.

It remains a possibility that some, or even most of these cases, may be R-L278* (R1b*), R-L389* (R1b1a*), R-P297* (R1b1a1*), R-V1636 (R1b1a2), R-PH155 (R1b2), R1b* (R-M343*), R1a* (R-M420*), an otherwise undocumented branch of R1 (R-M173), and/or back-mutations of a marker, from a positive to a negative ancestral state, and hence constitute undocumented subclades of R1b.

A compilation of previous studies regarding the distribution of R1b can be found in Cruciani et al. (2010). It is summarised in the table following. (Cruciani did not include some studies suggesting even higher frequencies of R1b1a1b [R-M269] in some parts of Western Europe.)

Distribution of R-V88, R-M73 and M269
Continent	Region	Sample size	Total R1b	R-P25 (unreliable marker for R1b1*)	R-V88 (R1b1b)	R-M269 (R1b1a1a2)	R-M73 (R1b1a1a1)
Africa	Northern Africa	691	5.9%	0.0%	5.2%	0.7%	0.0%
Africa	Central Sahel Region	461	23.0%	0.0%	23.0%	0.0%	0.0%
Africa	Western Africa	123	0.0%	0.0%	0.0%	0.0%	0.0%
Africa	Eastern Africa	442	0.0%	0.0%	0.0%	0.0%	0.0%
Africa	Southern Africa	105	0.0%	0.0%	0.0%	0.0%	0.0%
Europe	Western Europeans	465	57.8%	0.0%	0.0%	57.8%	0.0%
Europe	North-west Europeans	43	55.8%	0.0%	0.0%	55.8%	0.0%
Europe	Central Europeans	77	42.9%	0.0%	0.0%	42.9%	0.0%
Europe	North Eastern Europeans	74	1.4%	0.0%	0.0%	1.4%	0.0%
Europe	Russians	60	6.7%	0.0%	0.0%	6.7%	0.0%
Europe	Eastern Europeans	149	20.8%	0.0%	0.0%	20.8%	0.0%
Europe	South-east Europeans	510	13.1%	0.0%	0.2%	12.9%	0.0%
Asia	West Asians	328	5.8%	0.0%	0.3%	5.5%	0.0%
Asia	South Asians	288	4.8%	0.0%	0.0%	1.7%	3.1%
Asia	South-east Asians	10	0.0%	0.0%	0.0%	0.0%	0.0%
Asia	North-east Asians	30	0.0%	0.0%	0.0%	0.0%	0.0%
Asia	East Asians	156	0.6%	0.0%	0.0%	0.6%	0.0%
Total		5326					

=== R1b (R-L278) ===
R-L278 among modern men falls into the R-L754 and R-PH155 subclades, though it is possible some very rare R-L278* may exist as not all examples have been tested for both branches. Examples may also exist in ancient DNA, though due to poor quality it is often impossible to tell whether or not the ancients carried the mutations that define subclades.

Some examples described in older articles, for example two found in Turkey, are now thought to be mostly in the more recently discovered sub-clade R1b1b (R-V88). Most examples of R1b therefore fall into subclades R1b1b (R-V88) or R1b1a (R-P297). Cruciani et al. in the large 2010 study found 3 cases amongst 1173 Italians, 1 out of 328 West Asians and 1 out of 156 East Asians. Varzari found 3 cases in Ukraine, in a study of 322 people from the Dniester–Carpathian Mountains region, who were P25 positive, but M269 negative. Cases from older studies are mainly from Africa, the Middle East or Mediterranean, and are discussed below as probable cases of R1b1b (R-V88).

=== R1b1 (R-L754) ===
R-L754 contains the vast majority of R1b. The only known example of R-L754* (xL389, V88) is also the earliest known individual to carry R1b: "Villabruna 1", who lived circa 14,000 years BP (north east Italy). Villabruna 1 belonged to the Epigravettian culture.

=== R1b1a (R-L389) ===
R-L389, also known as R1b1a (L388/PF6468, L389/PF6531), contains the very common subclade R-P297 and the rare subclade R-V1636. It is unknown whether all previously reported R-L389* (xP297) belong to R-V1636 or not.

=== R1b1a1 (R-P297) ===
The SNP marker P297 was recognised in 2008 as ancestral to the significant subclades M73 and M269, combining them into one cluster. This had been given the phylogenetic name R1b1a1a (and, previously, R1b1a).

A majority of Eurasian R1b falls within this subclade, representing a very large modern population. Although P297 itself has not yet been much tested for, the same population has been relatively well studied in terms of other markers. Therefore, the branching within this clade can be explained in relatively high detail below.

=== R1b1a1a (R-M73) ===
R-M73, also known as R1b1a1a, is a Y-chromosome haplogroup that is a subclade of the broader R1b lineage. This haplogroup is defined by the M73 single nucleotide polymorphism (SNP) mutation. The two largest subclades are R-M478 and R-BY15590.

R-M73 is primarily found in populations across Central Asia, parts of Siberia, the Caucasus region, and to a lesser extent in the Middle East and South Asia. It is particularly prevalent among certain indigenous populations of the Altai region in Siberia.

R1b (R-73) has been found in 35.3 % of Eushta sub-group of Siberian Tatars.

Malyarchuk et al. (2011) found R-M73 in 13.2% (5/38) of Shors, 11.4% (5/44) of Teleuts, 3.3% (2/60) of Kalmyks, 3.1% (2/64) of Khakassians, 1.9% (2/108) of Tuvinians, and 1.1% (1/89) of Altaians. The Kalmyks, Tuvinians, and Altaian belong to a Y-STR cluster marked by DYS390=19, DYS389=14-16 (or 14–15 in the case of the Altaian individual), and DYS385=13-13.

Dulik et al. (2012) found R-M73 in 35.3% (6/17) of a sample of the Kumandin of the Altai Republic in Russia. Three of these six Kumandins share an identical 15-loci Y-STR haplotype, and another two differ only at the DYS458 locus, having DYS458=18 instead of DYS458=17. This pair of Kumandin R-M73 haplotypes resembles the haplotypes of two Kalmyks, two Tuvinians, and one Altaian whose Y-DNA has been analyzed by Malyarchuk et al. (2011). The remaining R-M73 Kumandin has a Y-STR haplotype that is starkly different from the haplotypes of the other R-M73 Kumandins, resembling instead the haplotypes of five Shors, five Teleuts, and two Khakassians.

While early research into R-M73 claimed that it was significantly represented among the Hazara of Afghanistan and the Bashkirs of the Ural Mountains, this has apparently been overturned. For example, supporting material from a 2010 study by Behar et al. suggested that Sengupta et al. (2006) might have misidentified Hazara individuals, who instead belonged to "PQR2" as opposed to "R(xR1a)." However, the assignment of these Hazaras' Y-DNA to the "PQR2" category by Behar et al. (2010) is probably ascribable to the habit that was popular for a while of labeling R-M269 as "R1b" or "R(xR1a)," with any members of R-M343 (xM269) being placed in a polyphyletic, catch-all "R*" or "P" category. Myres et al. (2011), Di Cristofaro et al. (2013), and Lippold et al. (2014) all agree that the Y-DNA of 32% (8/25) of the HGDP sample of Pakistani Hazara should belong to haplogroup R-M478/M73. Likewise, most Bashkir males have been found to belong to U-152 (R1b1a1a2a1a2b) and some, mostly from southeastern Bashkortostan, belonged to Haplogroup Q-M25 (Q1a1b) rather than R1b; contra this, Myres et al. (2011) found a high frequency of R-M73 among their sample of Bashkirs from southeast Bashkortostan (77/329 = 23.4% R1b-M73), in agreement with the earlier study of Bashkirs. Besides the high frequency of R-M73 in southeastern Bashkirs, Myres et al. also reported finding R-M73 in the following samples: 10.3% (14/136) of Balkars from the northwest Caucasus, 9.4% (8/85) of the HGDP samples from northern Pakistan (these are the aforementioned Pakistani Hazaras), 5.8% (4/69) of Karachays from the northwest Caucasus, 2.6% (1/39) of Tatars from Bashkortostan, 1.9% (1/54) of Bashkirs from southwest Bashkortostan, 1.5% (1/67) of Megrels from the south Caucasus, 1.4% (1/70) of Bashkirs from north Bashkortostan, 1.3% (1/80) of Tatars from Kazan, 1.1% (1/89) of a sample from Cappadocia, Turkey, 0.7% (1/141) of Kabardians from the northwest Caucasus, 0.6% (3/522) of a pool of samples from Turkey, and 0.38% (1/263) of Russians from Central Russia.

Besides the aforementioned Pakistani Hazaras, Di Cristofaro et al. (2013) found R-M478/M73 in 11.1% (2/18) of Mongols from central Mongolia, 5.0% (1/20) of Kyrgyz from southwest Kyrgyzstan, 4.3% (1/23) of Mongols from southeast Mongolia, 4.3% (4/94) of Uzbeks from Jawzjan, Afghanistan, 3.7% (1/27) of Iranians from Gilan, 2.5% (1/40) of Kyrgyz from central Kyrgyzstan, 2.1% (2/97) of Mongols from northwest Mongolia, and 1.4% (1/74) of Turkmens from Jawzjan, Afghanistan. The Mongols as well as the individual from southwest Kyrgyzstan, the individual from Gilan, and one of the Uzbeks from Jawzjan belong to the same Y-STR haplotype cluster as five of six Kumandin members of R-M73 studied by Dulik et al. (2012). This cluster's most distinctive Y-STR value is DYS390=19.

Karafet et al. (2018) found R-M73 in 37.5% (15/40) of a sample of Teleuts from Bekovo, Kemerovo oblast, 4.5% (3/66) of a sample of Uyghurs from Xinjiang Uyghur Autonomous Region, 3.4% (1/29) of a sample of Kazakhs from Kazakhstan, 2.3% (3/129) of a sample of Selkups, 2.3% (1/44) of a sample of Turkmens from Turkmenistan, and 0.7% (1/136) of a sample of Iranians from Iran. Four of these individuals (one of the Teleuts, one of the Uyghurs, the Kazakh, and the Iranian) appear to belong to the aforementioned cluster marked by DYS390=19 (the Kumandin-Mongol R-M73 cluster); the Teleut and the Uyghur also share the modal values at the DYS385 and the DYS389 loci. The Iranian differs from the modal for this cluster by having 13-16 (or 13–29) at DYS389 instead of 14-16 (or 14–30). The Kazakh differs from the modal by having 13–14 at DYS385 instead of 13-13. The other fourteen Teleuts and the three Selkups appear to belong to the Teleut-Shor-Khakassian R-M73 cluster from the data set of Malyarchuk et al. (2011); this cluster has the modal values of DYS390=22 (but 21 in the case of two Teleuts and one Khakassian), DYS385=13-16, and DYS389=13-17 (or 13–30, but 14–31 in the case of one Selkup).

A Kazakhstani paper published in 2017 found haplogroup R1b-M478 Y-DNA in 3.17% (41/1294) of a sample of Kazakhs from Kazakhstan, with this haplogroup being observed with greater than average frequency among members of the Qypshaq (12/29 = 41.4%), Ysty (6/57 = 10.5%), Qongyrat (8/95 = 8.4%), Oshaqty (2/29 = 6.9%), Kerey (1/28 = 3.6%), and Jetyru (3/86 = 3.5%) tribes. A Chinese paper published in 2018 found haplogroup R1b-M478 Y-DNA in 9.2% (7/76) of a sample of Dolan Uyghurs from Horiqol township, Awat County, Xinjiang.

=== R1b1a1b (R-M269) ===
R-M269, or R1b1a1b (as of 2018) amongst other names, is now the most common Y-DNA lineage in European males. It is carried by an estimated 110 million males in Europe.

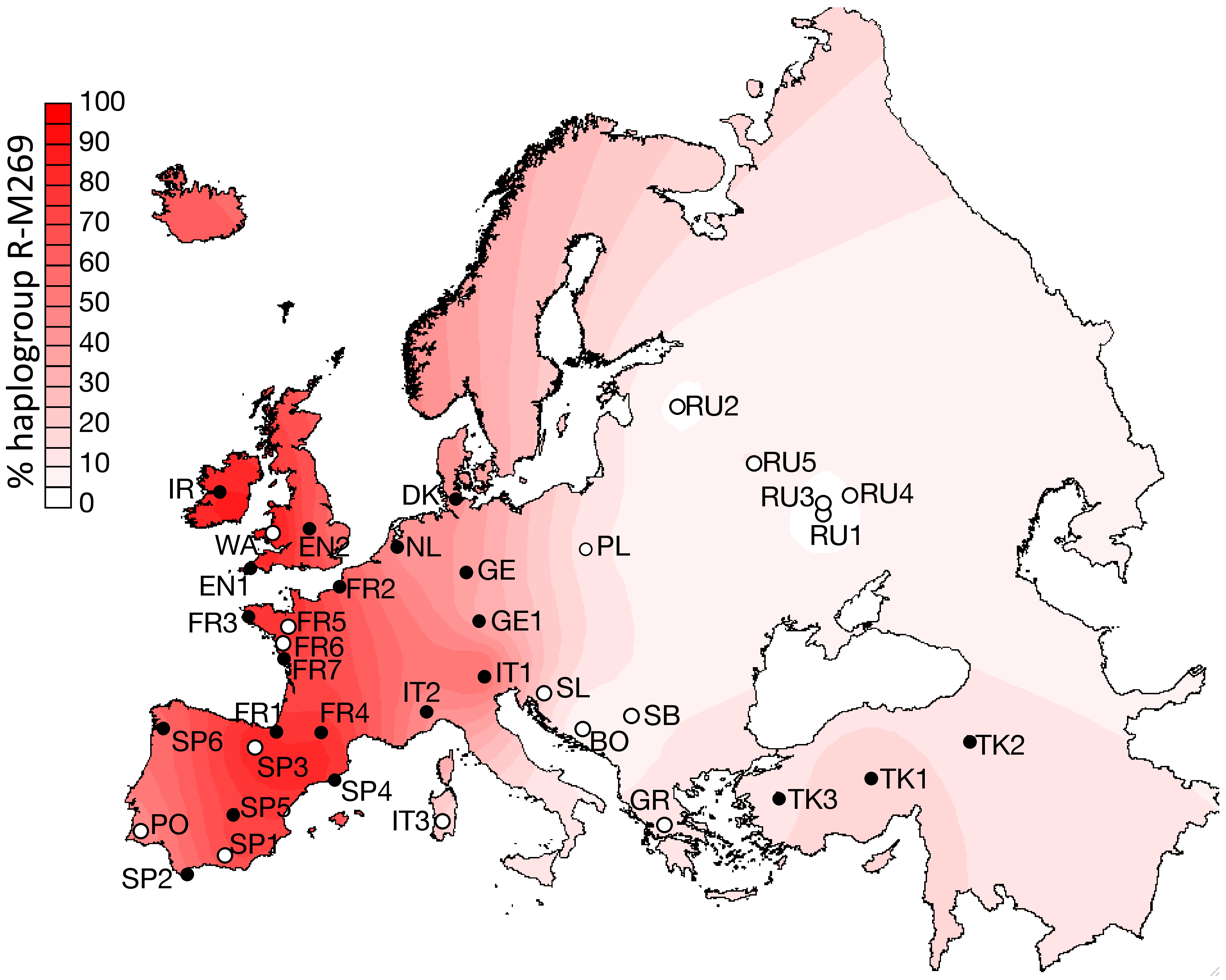
Projected spatial frequency distribution within Europe of haplogroup R-M269.

R-M269 has received significant scientific and popular interest due to its possible connection to the Indo-European expansion in Europe. Specifically the R-Z2103 subclade has been found to be prevalent in ancient DNA associated with the Yamna culture. All seven individuals in one were determined to belong to the R1b-M269 subclade.

Older research, published before researchers could study the DNA of ancient remains, proposed that R-M269 likely originated in Western Asia and was present in Europe by the Neolithic period. But results based on actual ancient DNA noticed that there was a dearth of R-M269 in Europe before the Bronze Age, and the distribution of subclades within Europe is substantially due to the various migrations of the Bronze and Iron Age. Likewise, the oldest samples classified as belonging to R-M269, have been found in Eastern Europe and Pontic-Caspian steppe, not Western Asia. Western European populations fall primarily under R-L151 (a subclade of R-M412 / R-L51), dividing into R-U106/S21, R-S1194, and R-P312/S116, with major downstream branches including R-Z18 and R-Z17 (under R-U106) and R-DF27 (including R-M167), R-U152 (including R-L2), and R-L21 (under R-P312).

Distribution of R-M269 in Europe increases in frequency from east to west. It peaks at the national level in Wales at a rate of 92%, at 82% in Ireland, 70% in Scotland, 68% in Spain, 60% in France (76% in Normandy), about 60% in Portugal, 50% in Germany, 50% in the Netherlands, 47% in Italy, 45% in Eastern England and 42% in Iceland. R-M269 reaches levels as high as 95% in parts of Ireland. It has also been found at lower frequencies throughout central Eurasia, but with relatively high frequency among the Bashkirs of the Perm region (84.0%). This marker is present in China and India at frequencies of less than one percent. In North Africa and adjoining islands, while R-V88 (R1b1b) is more strongly represented, R-M269 appears to have been present since antiquity. R-M269 has been found, for instance, at a rate of ~44% among remains dating from the 11th to 13th centuries at Punta Azul, in the Canary Islands. These remains have been linked to the Bimbache (or Bimape), a subgroup of the Guanche. In living males, it peaks in parts of North Africa, especially Algeria, at a rate of 10%. In Sub-Saharan Africa, R-M269 appears to peak in Namibia, at a rate of 8% among Herero males. In western Asia, R-M269 has been reported in 40% of Armenian males and over 35% in Turkmen males. (The table below lists in more detail the frequencies of M269 in regions in Asia, Europe, and Africa.)

Apart from basal R-M269* which has not diverged, there are (as of 2017) two primary branches of R-M269:

- R-L23 (R1b1a1b1; L23/PF6534/S141) and
- R-PF7558 (R1b1a1b2; PF7558/PF7562.)

R-L23 (Z2105/Z2103; a.k.a. R1b1a1b1) has been reported among the peoples of the Idel-Ural (by Trofimova et al. 2015): 21 out of 58 (36.2%) of Burzyansky District Bashkirs, 11 out of 52 (21.2%) of Udmurts, 4 out of 50 (8%) of Komi, 4 out of 59 (6.8%) of Mordvins, 2 out of 53 (3.8%) of Besermyan and 1 out of 43 (2.3%) of Chuvash were R1b-L23.

Subclades within the paragroup R-M269(xL23) – that is, R-M269* and/or R-PF7558 – appear to be found at their highest frequency in the central Balkans, especially Kosovo with 7.9%, North Macedonia 5.1% and Serbia 4.4%. Unlike most other areas with significant percentages of R-L23, Kosovo, Poland and the Bashkirs of south-east Bashkortostan are notable in having a high percentage of R-L23 (xM412) – at rates of 11.4% (Kosovo), 2.4% (Poland) and 2.4% south-east Bashkortostan. (This Bashkir population is also notable for its high level of R-M73 (R1b1a1a1), at 23.4%.) Five individuals out of 110 tested in the Ararat Valley of Armenia belonged to R-M269(xL23) and 36 to R-L23*, with none belonging to known subclades of L23.

In 2009, DNA extracted from the femur bones of 6 skeletons in an early-medieval burial place in Ergolding (Bavaria, Germany) dated to around AD 670 yielded the following results: 4 were found to be haplogroup R1b with the closest matches in modern populations of Germany, Ireland and the USA while 2 were in Haplogroup G2a.

The following gives a summary of most of the studies which specifically tested for M269, showing its distribution (as a percentage of total population) in Europe, North Africa, the Middle East and Central Asia as far as China and Nepal.

The phylogeny of R-M269 according to ISOGG 2017:

- M269/PF6517
  - R-M269* (R1b1a1b*)
  - L23/PF6534/S141
    - R-L23* (R1b1a1b1*)
    - L51/M412/PF6536/S167
      - R-L51*/R-M412* (R1b1a1b1a*)
      - L151/PF6542
        - R-L151* (R1b1a1b1a1a*)
        - M405/U106/S21
          - R-U106/R-M405/R-S21 (R1b1a1b1a1a1)
          - Z18
            - R-Z18
            - Z17
              R-Z17
        - AM01876/S1194
          R-S1194 (R1b1a1b1a1a3)
        - A8051
          R-A8051 (R1b1a1b1a1a4)
        - P312/PF6547/S116
          - R-P312 (R1b1a1b1a1a2)
          - DF27
            - R-DF27
            - M167/SRY2627
              R-M167
          - U152/S28
            - R-U152
            - L2
              R-L2
          - L21/M529/S145
            R-L21
      - PF7589/Z2118
        R-PF7589 (R1b1a1b1a2)
    - CTS1078/Z2103
      R-Z2103 (R1b1a1b1b)
  - PF7558
    R-PF7558 (R1b1a1b2)

=== R1b1a2 (R-V88) ===
R1b1a2 is defined by the presence of SNP marker V88, the discovery of which was announced in 2010 by Cruciani et al. Apart from individuals in southern Europe and Western Asia, the majority of R-V88 was found in the Sahel, especially among populations speaking Afroasiatic languages of the Chadic branch.

Based on a detailed phylogenic analysis, D'Atanasio et al. (2018) proposed that R1b-V88 originated in Europe about 12,000 years ago and crossed to North Africa between 8000 and 7000 years ago, during the 'Green Sahara' period. R1b-V1589, the main subclade within R1b-V88, underwent a further expansion around 5500 years ago, likely in the Lake Chad Basin region, from which some lines recrossed the Sahara to North Africa.

Marcus et al. (2020) provide strong evidence for this proposed model of North to South trans-Saharan movement: The earliest basal R1b-V88 haplogroups are found in several Eastern European Hunter Gatherers close to 11,000 years ago. The haplogroup then seemingly spread with the expansion of Neolithic farmers, who established agriculture in the Western Mediterranean by around 7500 BP. R1b-V88 haplogroups were identified in ancient Neolithic individuals in Germany, central Italy, Iberia, and, at a particularly high frequency, in Sardinia. A part of the branch leading to present-day African haplogroups (V2197) was already derived in Neolithic European individuals from Spain and Sardinia, providing further support for a North to South trans-Saharan movement. European autosomal ancestry, mtDNA haplogroups, and lactase persistence alleles have also been identified in African populations that carry R1b-V88 at a high frequency, such as the Fulani and Toubou. The presence of European Neolithic farmers in Africa is further attested by samples from Morocco dating from c. 5400 BC onwards.

Studies in 2005–08 reported "R1b*" at high levels in Jordan, Egypt and Sudan. (Note: Flores et al. (2005) found that 20 out of all 146 men tested (13.7%) – including 20 out of 45 men tested from the Dead Sea area of Jordan – were positive for M173 (R1), and negative for both the R1a markers SRY10831.2 and M17, as well as P25 (which was later discovered to be an unreliable marker for R1b1). Myres et al. (2011) indicates that they are mostly R-V88 (later known as R1b1b). Wood et al. (2005) also reported two Egyptian cases of R1* (R-M173*) that were negative for SRY10831 (R1a1) and the unreliable R1b1 marker P25, out of a sample of 1,122 males from African countries, including 92 from Egypt. Hassan et al. (2008) found an equally surprising 14 out of 26 (54%) of Sudanese Fula people who were M173+ and P25-.) Subsequent research by Myres et al. (2011) indicates that the samples concerned most likely belong to the subclade R-V88. According to Myres et al. (2011), this may be explained by a back-migration from Asia into Africa by R1b-carrying people. (Note: Myres et al. (2011): "The detection of V88 in Iran, Palestine and especially the Dead Sea, Jordan (Supplementary Table S4) provides an insight into the back to Africa migration route.)

Contrary to other studies, Shriner & Rotimi (2018) associated the introduction of R1b into Chad with the more recent movements of Baggara Arabs.

Distribution of R1b in Africa
Region	Population	Country	Language	Sample size	Total %	R1b1a2 (R-V88)	R1b1a1b (R-M269)	R1b1b* (R-V88*)	R1b1b2a2a1 (R-V69)
N Africa	Composite	Morocco	AA	338	0.0%	0.3%	0.6%	0.3%	0.0%
N Africa	Mozabite Berbers	Algeria	AA/Berber	67	3.0%	3.0%	0.0%	3.0%	0.0%
N Africa	Northern Egyptians	Egypt	AA/Semitic	49	6.1%	4.1%	2.0%	4.1%	0.0%
N Africa	Berbers from Siwa	Egypt	AA/Berber	93	28.0%	26.9%	1.1%	23.7%	3.2%
N Africa	Baharia	Egypt	AA/Semitic	41	7.3%	4.9%	2.4%	0.0%	4.9%
N Africa	Gurna Oasis	Egypt	AA/Semitic	34	0.0%	0.0%	0.0%	0.0%	0.0%
N Africa	Southern Egyptians	Egypt	AA/Semitic	69	5.8%	5.8%	0.0%	2.9%	2.9%
C Africa	Songhai	Niger	NS/Songhai	10	0.0%	0.0%	0.0%	0.0%	0.0%
C Africa	Fulbe	Niger	NC/Atlantic	7	14.3%	14.3%	0.0%	14.3%	0.0%
C Africa	Tuareg	Niger	AA/Berber	22	4.5%	4.5%	0.0%	4.5%	0.0%
C Africa	Ngambai	Chad	NS/Sudanic	11	9.1%	9.1%	0.0%	9.1%	0.0%
C Africa	Hausa	Nigeria (North)	AA/Chadic	10	20.0%	20.0%	0.0%	20.0%	0.0%
C Africa	Fulbe	Nigeria (North)	NC/Atlantic	32	0.0%	0.0%	0.0%	0.0%	0.0%
C Africa	Yoruba	Nigeria (South)	NC/Defoid	21	4.8%	4.8%	0.0%	4.8%	0.0%
C Africa	Ouldeme	Cameroon (Nth)	AA/Chadic	22	95.5%	95.5%	0.0%	95.5%	0.0%
C Africa	Mada	Cameroon (Nth)	AA/Chadic	17	82.4%	82.4%	0.0%	76.5%	5.9%
C Africa	Mafa	Cameroon (Nth)	AA/Chadic	8	87.5%	87.5%	0.0%	25.0%	62.5%
C Africa	Guiziga	Cameroon (Nth)	AA/Chadic	9	77.8%	77.8%	0.0%	22.2%	55.6%
C Africa	Daba	Cameroon (Nth)	AA/Chadic	19	42.1%	42.1%	0.0%	36.8%	5.3%
C Africa	Guidar	Cameroon (Nth)	AA/Chadic	9	66.7%	66.7%	0.0%	22.2%	44.4%
C Africa	Massa	Cameroon (Nth)	AA/Chadic	7	28.6%	28.6%	0.0%	14.3%	14.3%
C Africa	Other Chadic	Cameroon (Nth)	AA/Chadic	4	75.0%	75.0%	0.0%	25.0%	50.0%
C Africa	Shuwa Arabs	Cameroon (Nth)	AA/Semitic	5	40.0%	40.0%	0.0%	40.0%	0.0%
C Africa	Kanuri	Cameroon (Nth)	NS/Saharan	7	14.3%	14.3%	0.0%	14.3%	0.0%
C Africa	Fulbe	Cameroon (Nth)	NC/Atlantic	18	11.1%	11.1%	0.0%	5.6%	5.6%
C Africa	Moundang	Cameroon (Nth)	NC/Adamawa	21	66.7%	66.7%	0.0%	14.3%	52.4%
C Africa	Fali	Cameroon (Nth)	NC/Adamawa	48	20.8%	20.8%	0.0%	10.4%	10.4%
C Africa	Tali	Cameroon (Nth)	NC/Adamawa	22	9.1%	9.1%	0.0%	4.5%	4.5%
C Africa	Mboum	Cameroon (Nth)	NC/Adamawa	9	0.0%	0.0%	0.0%	0.0%	0.0%
C Africa	Composite	Cameroon (Sth)	NC/Bantu	90	0.0%	1.1%	0.0%	1.1%	0.0%
C Africa	Biaka Pygmies	CAR	NC/Bantu	33	0.0%	0.0%	0.0%	0.0%	0.0%
W Africa		Composite	—	123	0.0%	0.0%	0.0%	0.0%	0.0%
E Africa		Composite	—	442	0.0%	0.0%	0.0%	0.0%	0.0%
S Africa		Composite	—	105	0.0%	0.0%	0.0%	0.0%	0.0%
Total				1822					

- V88
  - undefined
    R-V88* (R1b1a2)
  - M18
    R-M18 (R1b1b1)
  - V35
    R-V35 (R1b1b2a1)
  - V69
    R-V69 (R1b1b2a2a1)

Two branches of R-V88, R-M18 and R-V35, are found almost exclusively on the island of Sardinia.

As can be seen in the above data table, R-V88 is found in northern Cameroon in west central Africa at a very high frequency, where it is considered to be caused by a pre-Islamic movement of people from Eurasia.

=== R1b1b1 (R-M18) ===
R1b1b1 is a sub-clade of R-V88, which is defined by the presence of SNP marker M18. It has been found only at low frequencies in samples from Sardinia and Lebanon.

=== R1b2 (R-PH155) ===
R1b2 is extremely rare and defined by the presence of PH155. Living males carrying subclades of R-PH155 have been found in Bahrain, Bhutan, Ladakh, Tajikistan, Turkey, Xinjiang, and Yunnan. ISOGG (2022) cites two primary branches: R-M335 (R1b2a) and R-PH200 (R1b2b).

The defining SNP of R1b2a, M335, was first documented in 2004, when an example was discovered in Turkey, though it was classified at that time as R1b4. Other examples of R-M335 have been reported in a sample of Hui from Yunnan, China and in a sample of people from Ladakh, India.

== Notable people ==
=== Royalty and nobility ===
- In the Eighteenth Dynasty of Egypt, ancient DNA testing of royal mummies identified Y-chromosomal haplogroup R1b across three consecutive generations. Tutankhamun carried Y-haplogroup R1b (alongside maternal mtDNA haplogroup K), which he inherited through the paternal line from his father (the KV55 mummy, generally identified as Akhenaten) and his grandfather Amenhotep III, whose mummy was recovered from tomb KV35.
- Spytihněv I, Duke of Bohemia (c. 875–915), a ruler of the Přemyslid dynasty, belonged on his paternal line to haplogroup R1b based on genetic analysis of his skeletal remains.
- In the Ottonian dynasty, whole-genome sequencing of the skeletal remains of the first and last Ottonian Holy Roman Emperors, Otto I ("the Great", 912–973) from Magdeburg Cathedral and his agnatic grandnephew Henry II ("Saint Henry", 973–1024) from Bamberg Cathedral, confirmed their third-degree patrilineal kinship and showed that both emperors carried R1b-P312 > DF19 > DF88 > Z17121 > FTA63331.
- In the Piast dynasty of Poland, archaeogenomic analysis of 33 burials from royal and ducal necropolises confirmed the identities of ten medieval members of the dynasty (including Władysław I Herman, c. 1044–1102; Bolesław III Wrymouth, 1086–1138; Konrad I of Masovia; and the Masovian dukes Bolesław IV of Warsaw and Janusz III of Masovia) and placed the Piast patriline in subclade R1b-BY3549, under R1b-P312 > L21 > DF13 > S524.
- In the House of Bourbon, Y-chromosome testing of three living male-line princes from the Bourbon-Parma and Orléans-Braganza branches (descending from Louis XIII of France and Philip V of Spain) showed that the royal Bourbon patriline belongs to R1b-U106 (M405) > R-Z381*.
- In the House of Oldenburg and its Holstein-Gottorp-Romanov branch, forensic DNA analysis of the skeletal remains of the last Russian emperor, Tsar Nicholas II (1868–1918), together with bloodstains preserved from the 1891 Ōtsu incident, identified his paternal lineage as R1b-M269 (R-M343), matching living patrilineal members of the House of Oldenburg.
- In the House of Beaufort (Somerset line), four of the five living agnatic descendants of Henry Somerset, 5th Duke of Beaufort (1744–1803) tested during the genetic investigation of the remains of Richard III of England carried R1b-U152. The Dukes of Beaufort trace their documented paternal genealogy to John of Gaunt, son of Edward III of England.

=== Political leaders ===
- George Washington belonged on his paternal line to R1b-U152 > R-BY32422 (R-FTE201), as determined by DNA sequencing of the skeletal remains of his paternal grandnephews (grandsons of his brother Samuel Washington) excavated at Harewood Cemetery in West Virginia and comparison with a living patrilineal Washington descendant.
- The Adams political family belongs on the paternal line to R1b-S1194, based on Y-STR and whole Y-chromosome sequencing of documented patrilineal descendants across five sons of the Massachusetts colonist Henry Adams of Braintree (1583–1646, born in Barton St David, Somerset, England), including President John Adams's great-grandfather Joseph Adams Sr. (1626–1694). All tested branches share the SNP path R-M269 > L23 > L51 > P310 > L151 > S1194 > CTS4528 (S1200) > S14328 > A8469 > S1196 > S6868 > FGC23894 (FGC23892) > FGC23887 > Z4471. Historical members on this patriline include:
  - John Adams (1735–1826), Founding Father, 1st Vice President, and 2nd President of the United States;
  - John Quincy Adams (1767–1848), 8th U.S. Secretary of State and 6th President of the United States (eldest son of John Adams);
  - Samuel Adams (1722–1803), Founding Father and 4th Governor of Massachusetts (second cousin of John Adams);
  - Charles Francis Adams Sr. (1807–1886), U.S. Minister to the United Kingdom (son of John Quincy Adams);
  - Henry Adams (1838–1918), historian and author (son of Charles Francis Adams Sr.);
  - Charles Francis Adams III (1866–1954), 44th U.S. Secretary of the Navy (great-grandson of John Quincy Adams).

=== Scientists and inventors ===
- The American inventor Thomas Edison (1847–1931) belonged on his paternal line to R-S1194 > R-CTS4528 > R-S14328 > R-A8469 > R-SZ5489 > R-Y28597 > R-S10242, as established through Y-STR and Big Y testing of patrilineal descendants of his great-grandfather, the Dutch-American Loyalist colonist John Edison (c. 1727–1814), in the Edison Y-DNA Surname Project.
- J. Craig Venter (born 1946) and James D. Watson (1928–2025), whose genomes were the first two personal diploid human genomes ever sequenced (Venter's by Sanger shotgun sequencing in 2007 and Watson's by massively parallel 454 sequencing in 2008), both belong to R1b-U106, in subclades R-L48 > L47 > L45 and R-L48 > Z9 > Z30, respectively.

== Health and functional genomics ==
Roughly 95% of the human Y chromosome consists of the Male-Specific Region (MSY), which does not swap genetic material (undergo homologous recombination) with the X chromosome during cell division. As a result, the MSY is passed down intact (clonally) from father to son as a single linked block of DNA known as a haplotype, meaning that all men in haplogroup R1b (R-M343) and its downstream subclades inherit a shared chromosomal backbone. Complete Y-chromosome DNA sequence assemblies and clinical cohort studies have identified several clade-wide structural features, gene copy-number variations, and physiological traits across R1b and its sublineages.

=== Structural genomics and mutation dynamics ===
In complete (de novo long-read) Y-chromosome sequences assembled by the Human Genome Structural Variation Consortium (HGSVC), R1b chromosomes have a notably compact centromere, the central constricted region of the chromosome where cell-division fibers attach. Specifically, the centromeric DYZ3 alpha-satellite higher-order repeat array (the repetitive DNA sequence that serves as the binding site for the kinetochore protein CENP-A) averages 341 kilobases (kbp) in R1b men, less than half the 787 kbp average found across non-R1b paternal lineages. All sequenced R1b chromosomes also share two inherited structural rearrangements (synapomorphies) with their sister lineage, haplogroup Q: an approximately 80-kbp DNA duplication that expands the DYZ19 repetitive satellite array on the chromosome's long arm (dated to around 36,000 years ago), and a flipped DNA segment (chromosomal inversion) that positions the standalone TSPY2 gene ahead (upstream) of the main TSPY multi-copy tandem gene array.

Within R1b-U106, end-to-end (multi-platform telomere-to-telomere) sequencing across four generations of an R1b1a-Z302 family pedigree measured the rate at which new mutations accumulate on the Y chromosome. Across the 48.8-megabase (Mbp) MSY, an average of 12.4 spontaneous (de novo) mutations arise per generation: 9.6 single-letter DNA changes (single-nucleotide variants), 1.8 small insertions or deletions (indels), and 1.0 large structural variant of 2.4 to 4.8 kbp that expands or contracts repetitive DYZ2 satellite DNA units. Of the new single-letter point mutations, 93.8% occur within the rapidly mutating Yq12 heterochromatic block, a densely packed, non-coding region at the end of the Y chromosome's long arm.

=== Spermatogenesis and reproductive fitness ===
The Y chromosome carries a tandem array of multiple copies of the TSPY1 gene, which is active in testicular germ cells during sperm production (spermatogenesis). In haplogroup-matched clinical cohorts comparing men with normal sperm counts (normozoospermic) against men with unexplained (idiopathic) infertility, TSPY1 copy number correlates positively with both sperm concentration (ρ = 0.331, P < 0.001) and total sperm count (ρ = 0.315, P < 0.001). Within the European haplogroup P*(xR1a) grouping, which consists predominantly of R1b carriers, men with normal sperm counts averaged 32.6 ± 9.0 TSPY1 copies, compared to 27.2 ± 7.3 copies in infertile men (P < 0.001). Carrying fewer than 33 TSPY1 copies was associated with a 1.5-fold higher risk of impaired sperm production (odds ratio [OR] = 1.5, 95% confidence interval [CI]: 1.2–2.0, P = 0.001).

In a survey of 1,216 sequenced human Y chromosomes, the main Western European R1b-M269 > L51 lineage retained the ancestral, balanced six-amplicon structure of the AZFc (azoospermia factor c) region, a fertility-critical zone composed of large palindromic DNA repeats (amplicons) maintained by natural (purifying) selection against deleterious deletions or duplications. Testicular RNA-sequencing of 77 R1b tissue donors in the GTEx (Genotype-Tissue Expression) project similarly showed stable expression of these ampliconic fertility genes across adult age groups, avoiding the age-related drift in HSFY and PRY gene expression observed in several other Y haplogroups.

=== Immunity and infectious disease ===
In British cardiovascular cohorts, macrophages (a class of immune white blood cells) from R1b (R1b-M269) carriers show roughly 1.6-fold higher baseline expression of two Y-linked genes: UTY (KDM6C, which encodes a histone demethylase and chromatin-scaffold protein that regulates gene activity) and the protein kinase gene PRKY, compared to macrophages from haplogroup I1 carriers. Higher expression of UTY and PRKY in R1b men supports adaptive immune antigen-presentation pathways without the heightened pro-inflammatory white blood cell (leukocyte) migration response seen in haplogroup I1.

In a 2020 clinical study of 300 men in Córdoba, Argentina (150 patients infected with the parasite that causes Chagas disease and 150 matched uninfected controls), R1b was significantly more common in uninfected controls than in Chagas patients (54% vs. 27%, P = 0.042) and was associated with lower rates of chronic Chagas heart muscle disease (chagasic cardiomyopathy). Among infected men, those lacking R1b had 5.1-fold higher odds of severe heart enlargement (cardiomegaly, defined as a chest X-ray cardiothoracic index >0.5; OR = 5.10, 95% CI: 3.31–8.17, P = 0.001), as well as higher rates of stretching of the heart's main pumping chamber (echocardiographic left-ventricular dilation) and reduced pumping efficiency (an ejection fraction below 59%, found in 52.6% of non-R1b patients compared to 12.0% of R1b patients, P = 0.001).

Early in the COVID-19 pandemic, country-level ecological comparisons noted a correlation between national R1b-S116 frequencies and European COVID-19 mortality rates. When evaluated in individual patients in a 2024 hospital case-control study of 479 men hospitalized with severe COVID-19 and 285 population controls in Asturias, northern Spain, R1b was less frequent among younger hospitalized men aged 65 or under than among older patients (59% vs. 69%, P = 0.007), though it occurred at higher rates in the subset of severe COVID-19 patients who had pre-existing high blood pressure (arterial hypertension).

=== Cardiovascular health ===
In a 2023 analysis of the CholeSTEMI registry in Asturias comparing 122 male patients (aged 65 or under) who suffered an early-onset severe heart attack (angiographically confirmed premature type 1 ST-elevation myocardial infarction, or STEMI) against 200 population controls, haplogroup R1b (R-M269) was significantly more frequent among the premature heart attack patients (72% [88/122] in STEMI vs. 59% [118/200] in controls, P = 0.02; overall haplogroup R OR = 1.65, 95% CI: 1.02–2.69, P = 0.04).

For late-onset coronary artery disease (CAD), early British cohort studies (the BHF-FHS and WOSCOPS cohorts) reported lower CAD risk in R1b1b2 carriers than in men belonging to haplogroup I, who had a 45% to 75% higher risk (OR = 1.45–1.75) relative to the predominantly R1b British baseline population. Larger biobank studies that controlled for fine-scale geographic ancestry across 152,186 British men (testing 90 Y-chromosome sublineages, including R1b-U106/S21, R1b-S128*, and R1b-S191*) and 181,472 European men in the UK Biobank found that inherited (germline) R1b sublineages track average baseline population rates for chronic coronary artery disease, blood pressure, and type 2 diabetes. By contrast, age-related somatic mosaic loss of the Y chromosome (mLOY) in white blood cells (leukocytes), an acquired condition in which aging blood cells lose their Y chromosome and no longer express UTY, promotes scar-forming (profibrotic) TGF-β1 macrophage signaling, scarring of the heart muscle (myocardial fibrosis), and mortality from heart failure.

== See also ==
- Atlantic modal haplotype
- Genealogical DNA test
- Y-DNA haplogroups in populations of Europe
- Subclades: R-M269 · R-L151 · R-S1194 · R-Z18 · R-Z17 · R-DF27 · R-M167 · R-L2 · R-L21
