= Sudden infant death with dysgenesis of the testes syndrome =

- Specialty: Medical genetics
- Symptoms: Sudden cardiorespiratory arrest leading to death and testes dysplasia
- Complications: Death
- Usual onset: Early infancy
- Duration: Rest of the infant's short lifespan
- Causes: Genetic mutation
- Differential diagnosis: Sudden infant death syndrome
- Prevention: None
- Prognosis: Bad, infants with the disorder usually die before the age of 1.
- Frequency: very rare, only 22 cases have been described in medical literature.
- Deaths: 22

Sudden infant death with dysgenesis of the testes syndrome is a very rare hereditary disorder which is characterized by sudden, deadly cardiorespiratory arrest and testes dysgenesis. This condition is most common among the Old Order Amish in Pennsylvania.

== Signs and symptoms ==
Biologically male infants with the disorder are often born with abnormally developed testes. Usually, the genitalia appears female or doesn't look either male or female. This isn't the case for biologically female infants, since they have normal reproductive organ development. Infants with this disorder also have an abnormally developed brainstem, which controls basic body functions. This often results in additional symptoms, including slow heart rate, breathing anomalies, irregular body temperature regulation, tongue and eye movement abnormalities, exaggerated startle reflex, and feeding difficulties, these symptoms usually lead to the early death characteristic of this disorder, which is often caused by cardio-respiratory arrest. An additional symptom not associated with the brainstem is the presence of an unusual cry which is unnervingly similar to the cry of a goat.

Additional symptoms include severe gastroesophageal reflux and bronchial and laryngeal spasms.

== Causes ==
This condition is caused by autosomal recessive loss-of-function mutations in the TSPYL1 gene, in chromosome 6.

== Epidemiology ==
Only 22 cases have been described in medical literature, 21 of them came from 9 sibships in the Old Order Amish community in Lancaster County, Pennsylvania. Only 1 of the 22 came from a non-Amish individual; a female infant with presumably consanguineous parents.
