= Haplogroup R-Z18 =

Human Y-chromosome DNA haplogroup

R-Z18 is a subclade of the R-U106 branch of Haplogroup R1b. It includes all men who have the single nucleotide polymorphism (SNP) designated Z18 in their Y chromosome.

== Description ==
R-Z18, also called R-Z19, is defined to be mutation in which the nucleotide at position 14,991,735 along the Y chromosome that has mutated from guanine (G) to adenine (A). R-U106 is one of the major sub groups of R1b in Europe, but Z18 only makes up about 5-10% of R-U106.

== Discovery ==
Z18 was discovered during Phase 3 of the 1000 Genomes Project and entered on 16 August 2014 into the SNP database dbSNP at the National Center for Biotechnology Information as reference SNP cluster report rs767290651.

== History and distribution ==
The R-Z18 subclade was formed around approximately 2850 BCE. It is a subclade of haplogroup R-U106, one of the principal R1b lineages in Europe. The earliest R-U106 sample was found in what is now Bohemia, among the early Corded Ware Culture. R-Z18 most likely formed somewhere in Northern Germany or Southern Scandinavia. The earliest R-Z18 sample identified is from late Neolithic Zealand, Denmark.

R-Z18 samples dating to the Late Neolithic and Nordic Bronze Age have been found in Denmark and southern Sweden. Samples from the Iron Age, in addition to Denmark and southern Sweden, have also been found in northern Norway, northeastern Germany, and in the Wielbark Culture of northern Poland. By the Migration Period and Viking Age samples are found in northwestern Germany, Bavaria, Hungary, Flanders, Anglo-Saxon England, Scandinavia, Iceland, and parts of the British Isles influenced by Scandinavians. Samples from the later Middle Ages and Early Modern Period have been found in Jutland, Cambridgeshire, and in the wreck of the Kronan.

R-Z18 has its highest concentrations in Norway and Sweden, but is also found throughout areas of Germanic migration, including the Low Countries, British Isles, and Central Europe. It is also present at lower frequencies across Europe, as well as in areas of the world settled by Europeans. R-Z18's early presence in Scandinavia indicate a likely origin in the region, with subsequent migrations of Germanic peoples during the Migration Era and Viking Age spreading the haplogroup around Europe.

== Subclades ==
Major known subclades of R-Z18 include R-ZP156, R-S11601, R-DF95, R-FGC7637, R-Z2396, R-S6119 and R-Z17. Although they continue to increase as more are found.

== See also ==
- Atlantic Modal Haplotype
- Genealogical DNA test
- Haplogroup R1b
- Human Y-chromosome DNA haplogroup
- Prehistoric Europe
- Y-DNA haplogroups in populations of Europe
