= Haplogroup R-M269 =

Gene group

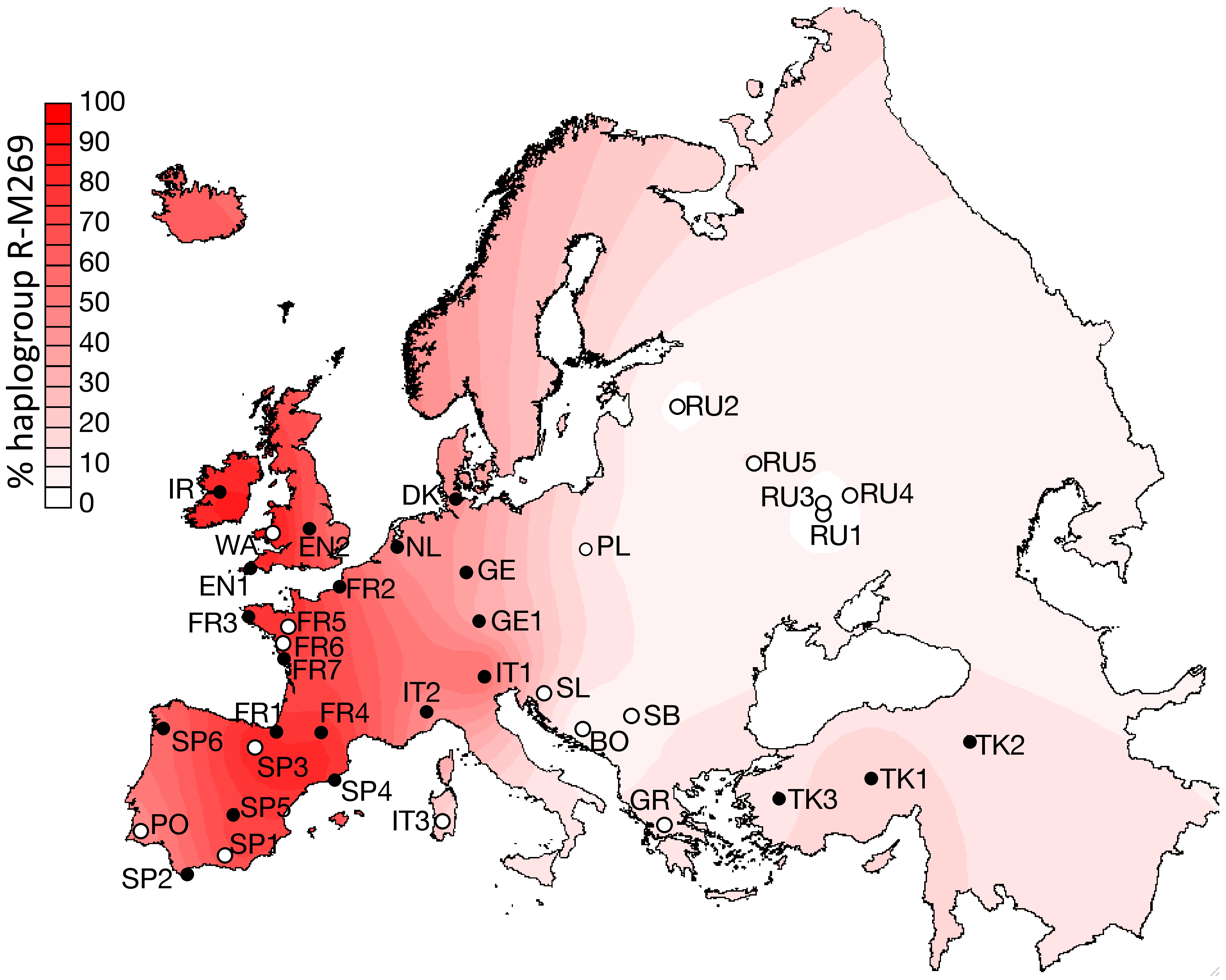
- Projected spatial frequency distribution for haplogroup R-M269 in Europe.
- Possible time of origin: 4,000–10,000 BP
- Possible place of origin: controversial; most likely North Caucasus, associated with Indo-European migrations
- Ancestor: R1b1a1a (R-P297)
- Descendants: L23; L51/M412, L151/P310; Z2103
- Defining mutations: M269

Haplogroup R-M269 is the sub-clade of human Y-chromosome haplogroup R1b that is defined by the SNP marker M269. According to ISOGG 2020 it is phylogenetically classified as R1b1a1b. It underwent intensive research and was previously classified as R1b1a2 (2003 to 2005), R1b1c (2005 to 2008), R1b1b2 (2008 to 2011) and R1b1a1a2 (2011 to 2020).

The oldest R-M269 samples have been found in the northern Caucasus region.

R-M269 is of particular interest for the genetic history of Western Europe, being the most common European haplogroup. It increases in frequency on an east to west gradient (its prevalence in Poland estimated at 22.7%, compared to Wales at 92.3%). It is carried by approximately 110 million European men (2010 estimate). The age of the mutation M269 is estimated at 4,000 to 10,000 years ago.

== Origin ==
R-M269 had formerly been dated to the Upper Paleolithic, but by about 2010 it was thought to have formed near the beginning of the Neolithic Revolution, about 10,000 years ago. More recent archaeogenetics studies since 2015, however, strongly suggest an origin among Eneolithic hunter-gatherers from eastern Europe.

Balaresque et al. (2010) based on the pattern of Y-STR diversity argued for a single source in the Near East and introduction to Europe via Anatolia in the Neolithic Revolution. In this scenario, Mesolithic hunter-gatherers in Europe would have been nearly replaced by the incoming farmers. By contrast, Busby et al. (2012) could not confirm the results of Balaresque et al. (2010) and could not make credible estimates of the age of R-M269 based on Y-STR diversity. Furthermore, more recent studies have found that the Y-DNA of Early European Farmers is typically haplogroup G2a.

According to Lazaridis et al. (2022), "the most likely hypothesis" is that the entire R-M269 clade originated "in the North Caucasus and steppe to the north".

The subclade R-P311 is substantially confined to Western Europe in modern populations. R-P311 is absent from Neolithic-era ancient DNA found in Western Europe, strongly suggesting that its current distribution is due to population movements within Europe taking place after the end of the Neolithic. The three major subclades of P311 are U106 (S21), L21 (M529, S145), and U152 (S28). These show a clear articulation within Western Europe, with centers in the Low Countries, the British Isles and the Alps, respectively. These lineages are associated with the non-Iberian steppe-related groups of the Bell Beaker culture, and demonstrate the relationship between steppe-related ancestry and R1b-M269 subclades, which are "the major lineage associated with the arrival of Steppe ancestry in western Europe after 2500 BC".

== Distribution ==
European R1b is dominated by R-M269. It has been found at generally low frequencies throughout central Eurasia, but with relatively high frequency among the Bashkirs of the Perm region (84.0%) and Baymaksky District (81.0%). This marker is present in China and India at frequencies of less than one percent. The table below lists in more detail the frequencies of M269 in regions in Asia, Europe, and Africa.

Distribution of R-M269 in Europe increases in frequency from east to west. It peaks at the national level in Wales at a rate of 92%, at 82% in Ireland, 70% in Scotland, 68% in Spain, 60% in France (76% in Normandy), about 60% in Portugal, 50% in Germany, 50% in the Netherlands, 47% in Italy, 45% in Eastern England, 43% in Denmark and 42% in Iceland. It is as high as 95% in parts of Ireland. It is also found in some areas of North Africa, where its frequency peaks at 10% in some parts of Algeria. M269 has likewise been observed among 8% of the Herero in Namibia. The R-M269 subclade has been found in ancient Guanche (Bimbapes) fossils excavated in Punta Azul, El Hierro, Canary Islands, which are dated to the 10th century (~44%). In western Asia, R-M269 has been reported in 29.2% of Assyrian males from Iran. Haplogroup R1b1 and its subclades in Asia. M269* (xL23) is found at highest frequency in the central Balkans notably Kosovo with 7.9%, North Macedonia 5.1% and Serbia 4.4%. Kosovo is notable in having a high percentage of descendant L23* or L23(xM412) at 11.4% unlike most other areas with significant percentages of M269* and L23* except for Poland with 2.4% and 9.5% and the Bashkirs of southeast Bashkortostan with 2.4% and 32.2% respectively. Notably this Bashkir population also has a high percentage of M269 sister branch M73 at 23.4%. Five individuals out of 110 tested in the Ararat Valley, Armenia belonged to R1b1a2* and 36 to L23*, with none belonging to known subclades of L23. Trofimova et al. (2015) found a surprising high frequency of R1b-L23 (Z2105/2103) among the peoples of the Idel-Ural. 21 out of 58 (36.2%) of Burzyansky District Bashkirs, 11 out of 52 (21.2%) of Udmurts, 4 out of 50 (8%) of Komi, 4 out of 59 (6.8%) of Mordvins, 2 out of 53 (3.8%) of Besermyan and 1 out of 43 (2.3%) of Chuvash were R1b-L23 (Z2105/2103), the type of R1b found in the recently analyzed Yamna remains of the Samara Oblast and Orenburg Oblast.

Especially Western European R1b is dominated by specific sub-clades of R-M269 (with some small amounts of other types found in areas such as Sardinia). Within Europe, R-M269 is dominated by R-M412, also known as R-L51, which according to Myres et al. (2010) is "virtually absent in the Near East, the Caucasus and West Asia." This Western European population is further divided between R-P312/S116 and R-U106/S21, which appear to spread from the western and eastern Rhine river basin respectively. Myres et al. note further that concerning its closest relatives, in R-L23*, it is "instructive" that these are often more than 10% of the population in the Caucasus, Turkey, and some southeast European and circum-Uralic populations.

In Western Europe it is present but in generally much lower levels apart from "an instance of 27% in Switzerland's Upper Rhone Valley." In addition, the sub-clade distribution map, Figure 1h titled "L11(xU106,S116)", in Myres et al. shows that R-P310/L11* (or as yet undefined subclades of R-P310/L11) occurs only in frequencies greater than 10% in Central England with surrounding areas of England and Wales having lower frequencies. This R-P310/L11* is almost non-existent in the rest of Eurasia and North Africa with the exception of coastal lands fringing the western and southern Baltic (reaching 10% in Eastern Denmark and 6% in northern Poland) and in Eastern Switzerland and surrounds.

- M269 (R1b1a1a2)
  - R-M269*
  - L23 (R1b1a1a2a)
    - R-L23*: Caucasus, Turkey, circum-Uralic; Upper Rhone Valley
    - L51/M412 (R1b1a1a2a1)
      - R-L51*/R-M412*: Central France
      - L151/P310/P311 (R1b1a1a2a1a)
        - R-P310/L11*: Central England
        - U106 (R1b1a1a2a1a1)
          R-U106: Netherlands, England, Norway; Germanic Europe
        - P312/S116 (R1b1a1a2a1a2)
          - S116*: Iberian Peninsula
          - U152 (R1b1a1a2a1a2b)
            U152: Corsica, Sardinia; Northern Italy, Central Italy, Switzerland, Central France, Russia (Perm region, Ghaeynae bashkirs)
          - L21_M529_S145 (R1b1a1a2a1a2c1)
            M529: Brittany, Ireland, Scotland, Wales
        - CTS4528 (R1b1a1a2a1a3a)
          R-CTS4528
    - Z2103 (R1b1a1a2a2)
      Z2103: Balkans and Turkey, Samara (Russia, Yamnaya a.c.), South Ural (burjan bashkirs)

In 2009, DNA extracted from the femur bones of 6 skeletons in an early-medieval burial place in Ergolding (Bavaria, Germany) dated to around c. 670 yielded the following results: 4 were found to be haplogroup R1b with the closest matches in modern populations of Germany, Ireland and the USA while 2 were in Haplogroup G2a.

Population studies which test for M269 have become more common in recent years, while in earlier studies men in this haplogroup are only visible in the data by extrapolation of what is likely. The following gives a summary of most of the studies which specifically tested for M269, showing its distribution (as a percentage of total population) in Europe, North Africa, the Middle East and Central Asia as far as China and Nepal.

Country	Sampling	sample	R-M269	Source
Wales	National	65	92.3%	Balaresque et al. (2009)
Spain	Basques	116	87.1%	Balaresque et al. (2009)
Ireland	National	796	85.4%	Moore et al. (2006)
Spain	Catalonia	80	81.3%	Balaresque et al. (2009)
Italy	Lombardy	78	80.8%	Grugni et al.
France	Ille-et-Vilaine	82	80.5%	Balaresque et al. (2009)
France	Haute-Garonne	57	78.9%	Balaresque et al. (2009)
England	Cornwall	64	78.1%	Balaresque et al. (2009)
France	Loire-Atlantique	48	77.1%	Balaresque et al. (2009)
Italy	Tuscany	42	76.2%	Di Giacomo et al. (2003)
France	Finistère	75	76.0%	Balaresque et al. (2009)
France	Basques	61	75.4%	Balaresque et al. (2009)
Italy	North East	30	73.5%	Di Giacomo et al. (2003)
Spain	East Andalucia	95	72.0%	Balaresque et al. (2009)
Spain	Castilla La Mancha	63	72.0%	Balaresque et al. (2009)
France	Vendée	50	68.0%	Balaresque et al. (2009)
Dominican Republic	National	26	65.4%	Bryc et al. (2010)
France	Baie de Somme	43	62.8%	Balaresque et al. (2009)
England	Leicestershire	43	62.0%	Balaresque et al. (2009)
Italy	North-East (Ladin)	79	60.8%	Balaresque et al. (2009)
Portugal	National	657	59.9%	Beleza et al. (2006)
Italy	Emilia	29	58.5%	Boattini et al. (2013)
Spain	Galicia	88	58.0%	Balaresque et al. (2009)
Spain	West Andalucia	72	55.0%	Balaresque et al. (2009)
Portugal	South	78	46.2%	Balaresque et al. (2009)
Italy	North-West	99	45.0%	Balaresque et al. (2009)
Denmark	National	56	42.9%	Balaresque et al. (2009)
Netherlands	National	84	42.0%	Balaresque et al. (2009)
Armenia	Ararat Valley	41	37.3%	Herrera et al. (2012)
Russia	Bashkirs	471	34.40%	Lobov (2009)
Italy	East Sicily	246	34.14%	Tofanelli et al. (2015)
Italy	West Sicily	68	33.0%	Tofanelli et al. (2015)
Germany	Bavaria	80	32.3%	Balaresque et al. (2009)
Turkey	Lake Van Armenians	33	32.0%	Herrera et al. (2012)
Armenia	Gardman	30	31.3%	Herrera et al. (2012)
Iran	Assyrians	48	29.2%	Grugni, Viola et al. (2012)
Poland	National	110	22.7%	Myres et al. (2007)
Slovenia	National	75	21.3%	Battaglia et al. (2008)
Kosovo Albanians	National	114	21.1%	Pericic2005
Slovenia	National	70	20.6%	Balaresque et al. (2009)
Turkey	Central	152	19.1%	Cinnioğlu et al. (2004)
Albanians in North Macedonia	National	64	18.8%	Battaglia et al. (2008)
Albanians	National	55	18.2%	Battaglia et al. (2008)
Crete	National	193	17.0%	King et al. (2008)
Italy	Sardinia	930	17.0%	Contu et al. (2008)
Turkey	Sasun Armenians	16	15.4%	Herrera et al. (2012)
Iran	North	33	15.2%	Regueiro et al. (2006)
Moldova		268	14.6%	Varzari (2006)
Greece	National	171	13.5%	King et al. (2008)
Turkey	West	163	13.5%	Cinnioğlu et al. (2004)
Romania	National	54	13.0%	Varzari (2006)
Croatia	National	89	12.4%	Battaglia et al. (2008)
Turkey	East	208	12.0%	Cinnioğlu et al. (2004)
Algeria	Northwest (Oran area)	102	11.8%	Robino et al. (2008)
Russia	Roslavl (Smolensk Oblast)	107	11.2%	Balanovsky et al. (2008)
Iraq	National	139	10.8%	Al-Zahery et al. (2003)
Nepal	Newar	66	10.6%	Gayden et al. (2007)
Bulgaria	National	808	10.5%	Karachanak et al. (2013)
Serbia	National	100	10.0%	Belaresque et al. (2009)
Lebanon	National	914	7.3%	Zalloua et al. (2008)
Tunisia	National	601	0.3%	Bekada et al. (2013)
Tunisia	Tunis	139	7.2%	Adams et al. (2008)
Morocco	National	760	5%	Bekada et al. (2013)
Libya	National	83	0.0%	Bekada et al. (2013)
Egypt	National	360	2.9%	Bekada et al. (2013)
Algeria	National	156	7.0%	Bekada et al. (2013)
Algeria	Algiers, Tizi Ouzou	46	6.5%	Adams et al. (2008)
Bosnia-Herzegovina	Serbs	81	6.2%	Marjanovic et al. (2005)
Iran	South	117	6.0%	Regueiro et al. (2006)
Russia	Repyevka (Voronezh Oblast)	96	5.2%	Balanovsky et al. (2008)
UAE		164	3.7%	Cadenas et al. (2007)
Bosnia-Herzegovina	Bosniaks	85	3.5%	Marjanovic et al. (2005)
Pakistan		176	2.8%	Sengupta et al. (2006)
Russia	Belgorod	143	2.8%	Balanovsky et al. (2008)
Russia	Ostrov (Pskov Oblast)	75	2.7%	Balanovsky et al. (2008)
Russia	Pristen (Kursk Oblast)	45	2.2%	Balanovsky et al. (2008)
Bosnia-Herzegovina	Croats	90	2.2%	Marjanovic et al. (2005)
Qatar		72	1.4%	Cadenas et al. (2007)
China		128	0.8%	Sengupta et al. (2006)
India	various	728	0.5%	Sengupta et al. (2006)
Croatia	Osijek	29	0.0%	Battaglia et al. (2008)
Yemen		62	0.0%	Cadenas et al. (2007)
Tibet		156	0.0%	Gayden et al. (2007)
Nepal	Tamang	45	0.0%	Gayden et al. (2007)
Nepal	Kathmandu	77	0.0%	Gayden et al. (2007)
Japan		23	0.0%	Sengupta et al. (2006)

== Sub-clades ==
=== R1b1a1a2a (R-L23) ===
R-L23* (R1b1a1a2a*) is now most commonly found in Europe, Anatolia, the Caucasus.

=== R1b1a1a2a1 (R-L51) ===
R-L51* (R1b1a1a2a1*) is now concentrated in a geographical cluster centred on southern France and northern Italy.

=== R1b1a1a2a1a (R-L151) ===
R-L151 (L151/PF6542, CTS7650/FGC44/PF6544/S1164, L11, L52/PF6541, P310/PF6546/S129, P311/PF6545/S128) also known as R1b1a1a2a1, and its subclades, include most males with R1b in Western Europe.

=== R1b1a1a2a1a1 (R-U106) ===
This subclade is defined by the presence of the SNP U106, also known as S21 and M405. It appears to represent over 25% of R1b in Europe. In terms of percentage of total population, its epicenter is Friesland, where it makes up 44% of the population. In terms of total population numbers, its epicenter is Central Europe, where it comprises 60% of R1 combined. See also Haplogroup R-Z18

- U106/S21/M405
  - un‑defined
    R-U106* (R-U106-*)
  - FGC3861
    R-FGC3861 (R1b1a2a1a1a)
  - Z18
    R-Z18 (R1b1a2a1a1b)
  - Z381
    - S264
      R-S264 (R1b1a2a1a1c1)
    - S499
      R-S499 (R1b1a2a1a1c2)
    - M1994
      R-M1994 (R1b1a2a1a1c3)
  - FGC396
    R-FGC396 (R1b1a2a1a1d)
  - S12025
    R-S12025 (R1b1a2a1a1e)

While this sub-clade of R1b is frequently discussed amongst genetic genealogists, the following table represents the peer-reviewed findings published so far in of Myres et al. and Sims et al.

Population	Sample size	R-M269	R-U106	R-U106-1
Austria	22	27%	23%	0.0%
Central/South America	33	0.0%	0.0%	0.0%
Czech Republic	36	28%	14%	0.0%
Denmark	113	34%	17%	0.9%
Eastern Europe	44	5%	0.0%	0.0%
England	138	57%	20%	1.4%
France	56	52%	7%	0.0%
Germany	332	43%	19%	1.8%
Ireland	102	80%	6%	0.0%
Italy	282	37%	4%	0.0%
Jordan	76	0.0%	0.0%	0.0%
Middle-East	43	0.0%	0.0%	0.0%
Netherlands	94	54%	35%	2.1%
Oceania	43	0.0%	0.0%	0.0%
Oman	29	0.0%	0.0%	0.0%
Pakistan	177	3%	0.0%	0.0%
Palestine	47	0.0%	0.0%	0.0%
Poland	110	23%	8%	0.0%
Russia	56	21%	5.4%	1.8%
Slovenia	105	17%	4%	0.0%
Switzerland	90	58%	13%	0.0%
Turkey	523	14%	0.4%	0.0%
Ukraine	504	6%	1%	0.0%
United States (European)	125	46%	15%	0.8%
United States (Afroamerican)	118	14%	2.5%	0.8%

=== R-P312 ===
R1b1a1a2a1a2, better known as R-P312 (or R-S116) is one of the most common types of R-M269 in Europe, alongside R-U106. Myres et al. described it as originating in and spreading from the west of the Rhine basin.

R-P312 has been the subject of significant, ongoing study concerning its complex internal structure.

- P312
  - R-P312*
  - DF27
    - R-S227/Z196
    - R-Z2552
    - R-L881
    - R-A431
  - U152
    - R-L2
    - R-S206
    - R-Z56
  - L21
    - R-A7905
    - R-A5846
    - R-DF63 (R-S522)
    - R-DF13 (R-CTS241/R-S521)
  - R-L238
  - R-DF19
  - R-DF99

==== R-DF27 ====
R-M153

R-M153 is a subclade of R-DF27 that has been found mostly in Basques and Gascons, among whom it represents a sizeable fraction of the Y-DNA pool, though is also found occasionally among Iberians in general. The first time it was located (Bosch 2001) it was described as H102 and included seven Basques and one Andalusian.

R-M167

R-M167 is a subclade of R-DF27 defined by the presence of the marker M167. The first author to test for this marker (long before current haplogroup nomenclature existed) was Hurles in 1999, who tested 1158 men in various populations. He found it relatively common among Basques (13/117: 11%) and Catalans (7/32: 22%). Other occurrences were found among other French, British, Spaniards, Béarnais, and Germans.

In 2000 Rosser et al., in a study which tested 3616 men in various populations also tested for that same marker, naming the haplogroup Hg22, and again it was found mainly among Basques (19%), in lower frequencies among French (5%), Bavarians (3%), Spaniards (2%), Southern Portuguese (2%), and in single occurrences among Romanians, Slovenians, Dutch, Belgians and English.::In 2001 Bosch described this marker as H103, in 5 Basques and 5 Catalans. Further regional studies have located it in significant amounts in Asturias, Cantabria and Galicia, as well as again among Basques. Cases in the Azores have been reported. In 2008 two research papers by López-Parra and Adams, respectively, confirmed a strong association with all or most of the Pyrenees and Eastern Iberia.

In a larger study of Portugal in 2006, with 657 men tested, Beleza et al. confirmed similar low levels in all the major regions, from 1.5%–3.5%.

R-L165

This subclade is defined by the presence of the marker S68, also known as L165. It is found in England, Scandinavia, and Scotland (in this country it is mostly found in the Northern Isles and Outer Hebrides). It has been suggested, therefore, that it arrived in the British Isles with Vikings.

==== R-U152 ====
R-U152 is defined by the presence of the marker U152, also called S28. Its existence was confirmed by Sims et al. (2007). Myres et al. report this clade "is most frequent (20–44%) in Switzerland, Italy, France and Western Poland, with additional instances exceeding 15% in some regions of England and Germany." Similarly Cruciani et al. (2010) reported frequency peaks in Northern and Central Italy and France. Out of a sample of 135 men in Tyrol, Austria, 9 tested positive for U152/S28. Far removed from this apparent core area, Myres et al. also mention a sub-population in north Bashkortostan, where 71% of 70 men tested belong to R-U152. They propose this to be the result of an isolated founder effect. King et al. (2014) reported four living descendants of Henry Somerset, 5th Duke of Beaufort in the male line tested positive for U-152. Ancient samples from the central European Bell Beaker, Hallstatt and Tumulus cultures belonged to this subclade. Analyzed Iron Age Latins, Etruscans and Alpine Celts, dating between 1000 and 100 BCE, belonged primarily to haplogroup R1b-U152 (including the clades L2, Z56 and Z193). Ancient samples of Cenomani Cisalpine Gauls from Verona who lived between the 3rd and 1st centuries BCE were predominantly R-U152. U152 is also found at low frequencies of around 3%-4% in Morocco, Algeria, and Tunisia, pointing to direct maritime contacts between the European and North African sides of the western Mediterranean.

==== R-L21 ====
R-L21, also known as R-M529 and R-S145, is most common in Ireland, Scotland and Wales (i.e. at least 25–50% of their male populations. R-L21 has two primary subclades: R-A5846 and R-S552.

R-DF13
A primary subclade of R-S552, R-DF13 – also known as R-S521, R-Z2542 and R-CTS8221 – is one of the most common subclades of R-L21. At least one study estimated that R-DF13 would be found among more than 50% of living Irish males. The following are among the most common subclades within R-DF13.

- R-DF21, a primary subclade of R-DF13, defined by the presence of the marker DF21 a.k.a. S192. R-DF21 makes up about 10% of all L21 men and is circa 3000 years old.
- R-L159.2 is a subclade of R-DF13, defined by the marker L159/S169. It is known as R-L159.2 because of an unrelated parallel mutation (L159.1), found within haplogroup I2a1a1a (a.k.a. I-L158 or I-M26). Consequently, some Y-DNA trees exclude L159/S169 completely, on the basis that it may be an unreliable marker. For instance, as of 2024, Yfull refers to an equivalent subclade as R-FGC80001 (i.e. R-L21 > R-S552 > R-DF13 > R-Z255 > R-FGC80001). R-L159.2 appears to be associated with the Laigin, an ethno-tribal group, after whom the Kingdom of Leinster was named. It is common in males from coastal areas surrounding the Irish Sea, including western Wales, the Isle of Man and the Hebrides; R-L159.2 has also been found at significant levels in Norway, western and southern Scottish mainland, parts of England, northwest France, and northern Denmark.
- R-L193: this subclade within R-DF13 is defined by the presence of the marker L193. Many surnames with this marker are associated geographically with the western "Border Region" of Scotland. A few other surnames have a Highland association. R-L193 is a relatively young subclade likely born within the last 2000 years.
- R-L226, under R-DF13, is defined by the presence of the marker L226, also known as S168. Commonly referred to as Irish Type III, it is concentrated in central western Ireland and associated with the Dál gCais kindred.
- R-L371: a subclade within R-DF13 defined by the presence of the marker L371 – sometimes referred to as the "Welsh modal haplotype". It is associated with ancient Welsh kings and princes.

== See also ==
- Y-DNA haplogroups in populations of Europe
- Haplogroup R1a
