= Modal haplotype =

Ancestral haplotype derived from the DNA test results of a specific group of people

A modal haplotype is an ancestral haplotype derived from the DNA test results of a specific group of people, using genetic genealogy.

The two most commonly discussed modal haplotypes are the Atlantic Modal Haplotype (the most common haplotype in parts of Europe, associated with Haplogroup R1b) and the Cohen Modal Haplotype (the haplotype associated with the Jewish Cohanim tradition). However, a specific modal haplotype may be determined for any genealogical DNA test-based surname project or other test group.

== List of modal haplotypes ==
- 1-SNP "J2a Cohen Modal Haplotype" (J2a-CMH) All Y-DNA testers as of December 2025--with minor, explainable exceptions--who have the J-FGC4992 single nucleotide polymorphism (SNP) are of Jewish paternal heritage with an oral tradition of descent from the ancient Israelite priesthood. The genetics indicate that the time of the common ancestor for the 400+ known testers worldwide is roughly 500 to 900 BCE, consistent with that oral tradition. {{cite }} {{}}
- 6-marker Atlantic Modal Haplotype (AMH) with the markers DYS388*12, DYS390*24, DYS391*11, DYS392*13, DYS393*13, and DYS394*14
- 12-marker Western Atlantic Modal Haplotypes (WAMH) within haplogroup R1b1a2
- 12-marker Northwest Irish Modal Haplotype (NWIMH) R-M222 (R1b1a2a1a2c1a1a1a1) with the markers DYS390*25, DYS385b*13, DYS392*14, DYS448*18, DYS449*30, DYS464*15,16,16,17, DSY456*17, DYS607*16, DYS413*21,23, DYS534*16, DYS481*25, and DYS714*24
- 9-marker Western Norway Modal Haplotype within haplogroup I1a with the motif 14-12-28-23-10-11-13-14-14
- 6-marker Frisian Modal Haplotype (FMH) within haplogroup R1b in cluster R-U106 (R1b1b2a1a)
- 6-marker Cohen Modal Haplotype (CMH) within haplogroup J1-M267 in cluster J-P58 with the motif 14-16-23-10-11-12 - replaced by Extended Cohen Modal Haplotype
- 12-marker Extended Cohen Modal Haplotype (eCMH) J1-Z18271 with the markers DYS393*12, DYS390*23, DYS19*14, DYS391*10, DYS385a*13, DYS385b*15, DYS426*11, DYS388*16, DYS439*12, DYS389-1*13, DYS392*11, and DYS389-2*17
- 10-marker Romani/Gypsy Modal Haplotype within haplogroup H1a-M82 with the markers DYS19*15, DYS389I*14, DYS389II*30, DYS390*22, DYS391*10, DYS392*11, DYS393*12, DYS437*14, DYS438*9, DYS439*11
- 17-marker Buryat-Mongolian Modal Haplotype within haplogroup N1c1 with the motif 14-11-13-12-11-16-23-10-14-14-11-8-11-12-8-10-10
- 23-marker Yakut Modal Haplotype within haplogroup N1c with the markers DYS19*14, DYS389-I*14, DYS389-II*32, DYS390*23, DYS391*11, DYS392*16, DYS393*14, DYS385a*11, DYS385b*13, DYS438*11, DYS439*10, DYS437*14, DYS448*19, DYS456*14, DYS635*22, GATA H4*12 (or H4*11), DYS576*16, DYS481*20, DYS549*12, DYS533*11, DYS570*19, and DYS643*12
- 7-marker Pathan Modal Haplotype within haplogroup R1a1a-M198

== See also ==
- Genealogical DNA test
- Genetic genealogy
