= TSPY1 =

Protein-coding gene in humans

Identifiers
- Aliases: TSPY1, CT78, DYS14, TSPY, pJA923, testis specific protein, Y-linked 1, testis specific protein Y-linked 1
- External IDs: OMIM: 480100; GeneCards: TSPY1

Gene location (Human)
Chr.	Y chromosome (human)
Band	Yp11.2	Start	9,466,955 bp
Band	Yp11.2	End	9,469,749 bp
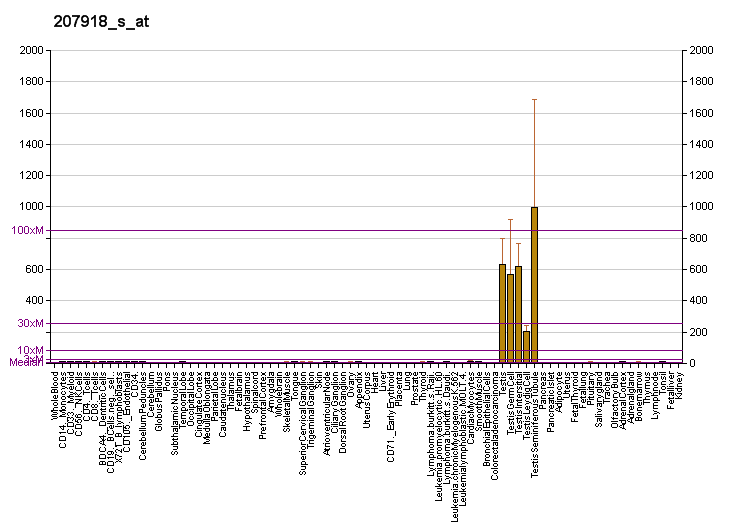
RNA expression pattern
Bgee	Human / Mouse (ortholog); Top expressed in: testicle; gonad; right testis; left testis / n/a; More reference expression data
BioGPS	More reference expression data
Gene ontology
Molecular function	protein binding; molecular function
Cellular component	cytoplasm; nucleus; cellular component
Biological process	multicellular organism development; nucleosome assembly; cell differentiation; cell population proliferation; sex differentiation; spermatogenesis; gonadal mesoderm development
Sources:Amigo / QuickGO
Orthologs
Databases	NCBI: entry; OMA: entry
Species	Human	Mouse
Entrez	7258	n/a
Ensembl	ENSG00000258992	n/a
UniProt	Q01534	n/a
RefSeq (mRNA)	NM_003308; NM_001197242; NM_001320964	n/a
RefSeq (protein)	NP_001184171; NP_001307893; NP_003299	n/a
Location (UCSC)	Chr Y: 9.47 – 9.47 Mb	n/a
PubMed search		n/a
- Wikidata
View/Edit Human

Testis-specific Y-encoded protein 1 is a protein that in humans is encoded by the TSPY1 gene.

The protein encoded by this gene is found only in testicular tissue and may be involved in spermatogenesis. Approximately 35 copies of this gene are present in humans, but only a single, nonfunctional orthologous gene is found in mice. Two transcript variants encoding different isoforms have been found for this gene. The protein is strongly overexpressed in gonadoblastoma.

== See also ==
- TSPYL1: TSPY1 like protein
