= Haplogroup R-Z17 =

Human Y-chromosome DNA haplogroup

R-Z17 is a subclade of the R-U106 branch of the human Y-chromosome haplogroup named Haplogroup R, associated with the single nucleotide polymorphism (SNP) designated Z17. R-Z17 likely branched off from its parent clade, R-Z18, around 2150 BCE, with a range of 2805 BCE to 1607 BCE.

== Origins and distribution ==
R-Z17 has its origins rooted in the R-U106 haplogroup which is predominant in coastal Western Europe. The R-Z17 subclade is associated with early populations in Scandinavia and Northern Europe, with a notable mention from a burial study conducted in Sigtuna, Sweden, around 1000 BCE. The investigation revealed a lineage refined to haplogroups Z18 > Z17 > S17032. The study titled "Genomic and Strontium Isotope Variation Reveal Immigration Patterns in a Viking Age Town" identified substantial migration and movement during that period, connecting individuals to regions as far as Lithuania.

== Genetic characteristics ==
The Z17 SNP, which defines the R-Z17 haplogroup, is a type of point mutation occurring at a specific position on the Y chromosome. This change is from the ancestral allele C to the derived allele G. The exact position of this mutation is at chromosome coordinates chrY:3364462..3364462 on the positive strand.

This lineage further branches into several known subclades, including R-Z372, R-BY18896, R-BY18864, R-BY40633, R-S17032, R-S20045, R-FT60052, and R-BY13800, providing a genetic roadmap to understanding the ancestral connections and migration patterns of early European populations.

The most recent common ancestor of all members of haplogroup R-Z17 is estimated to have been born around 1950 BCE, with a 95% probability range of 2587 BCE to 1440 BCE. As of March 2025, there are 3,708 DNA tested descendants of R-Z17, who have traced their earliest known origins to Sweden, England, Scotland, and 42 other countries.

== Ancient connections ==
- Nordland 1502, an individual from Iron Age Europe (300–400 CE) uncovered in present-day Engeløya, Norway, was associated with the Pre-Viking Norway cultural group. This individual belonged to the R-Z17 haplogroup, more specifically, positioned downstream from R-Z372 at R-CTS5533.
- Szólád 4, a man who lived circa 412–604 CE during the Medieval Age, was discovered in what is now known as Szólád, Cserénfa, Hungary. He was associated with the Longobard Barbarian cultural group.
- Hatherdene 6, a man aged between 26 and 44 years old, lived circa 415–537 CE during the Medieval Age, and was discovered in what is now known as Hatherdene Close, Cambridgeshire, England. He was associated with the Medieval Britain cultural group.
- Straubing 316 and Straubing 393 were men discovered in what is now known as Straubing-Bajuwarenstraße, Germany, associated with the Bavarian cultural group during the Early Medieval Bavaria Age. Straubing 316, aged between 40 and 60 years old, lived circa 480–510 CE, while Straubing 393, aged between 40 and 55 years old, lived circa 460–530 CE.
- Dunum 11, a man who lived circa 672–773 CE during the Medieval Age, was discovered in what is now known as Dunum, Lower Saxony, Germany. He was associated with the Medieval Germany cultural group.
- Balladoole, an individual who lived circa 800–1000 CE during the Viking Age, was discovered in the area now recognized as Balladoole, Arbory, Isle of Man. He was identified with the Viking Britain cultural group. Genetic analysis traces his haplogroup to R-Z17.
- Koksijde 6 and 32, associated with the Merovingian cultural group who lived between 676 - 876 CE during the Early Medieval Age and was found in the region now known as Koksijde, West Flanders, Belgium
- Vatnsdalur A7, a man aged between 35 and 45 years old, lived circa 850–1050 CE during the Medieval Age, and was discovered in what is now known as Vatnsdalur, Iceland. He was associated with the Pre-Christian Icelander cultural group.
- Viking 204, a man who lived circa 900–1000 CE during the Viking Age, was discovered in the region now known as Deerness, Orkney, Scotland (Orkney). He was associated with the Viking Orkney cultural group.

== Notable people ==
- Woody Harrelson, an American actor and playwright, is known to belong to the R-Z17 haplogroup, specifically the R-Z372 branch.
- Alexander Lange Kielland, a Norwegian author and playwright, is connected to the R-Z17 haplogroup via the R-Z372 branch. His detailed Y-DNA haplogroup was determined by Big Y testing of patrilineal descendants of Alexander's uncles and 4th cousin. This research has been conducted by David Widerberg Howden, administrator of the Norway DNA Project, in collaboration with Liv Anne and Solveig Kielland.

== See also ==
- Haplogroup R1b
- Human Y-chromosome DNA haplogroup
- Prehistoric Europe
- Y-DNA haplogroups in populations of Europe
