= Haplogroup Q =

Haplogroup Q may refer to:

- Haplogroup Q (mtDNA), a human mitochondrial DNA (mtDNA) haplogroup
- Haplogroup Q (Y-DNA), a human Y-chromosome (Y-DNA) haplogroup
