= Haplogroup R1b-L2 =

Human Y-chromosome DNA haplogroup

- Possible time of origin: 4400 years before present
- Coalescence age: 4400 years before present
- Possible place of origin: Western Europe
- Ancestor: R-M269; R1b-P312; R1b-U152
- Highest frequencies: Northern and Western Italians; Swiss; French; Southwestern Germans

R-L2 is a human Y-chromosome DNA haplogroup, characteristic of a part of the inhabitants of Italy and Western Europe in general. R-L2 is thought to have originated around the Alps or southern Rhine, additionally, due to R-L2 having split off of R1b-U152 relatively early and it being a major branch, R-L2 carriers were largely contemporary with R-U152 carriers leading to R-L2 also having multiple large and diverse branches, of which some are respectively linked to Etruscans, Italics and the Alpine Celts.
