= Repyevka, Belgorod Oblast =

Repyevka Репьевка
- Selo
- Location within Belgorod Oblast Location within Russia
- Coordinates: 50°34′N 37°59′E
- Country: Russia
- Region: Belgorod Oblast
- District: Volokonovsky District
- Time zone: UTC+3:00

Repyevka (Russian: Репьевка) is a rural locality (a selo) and the administrative center of Repyevsky Rural Settlement, Volokonovsky District, Belgorod Oblast, Russia. The population was 211 as of 2010. There are 3 streets.

== Geography ==
Repyevka is located 19 km northeast of Volokonovka (the district's administrative centre) by road. Lutovinovo is the nearest rural locality.
