= Repyevka, Belebeyevsky District, Republic of Bashkortostan =

Repyevka Репьевка
- Village
- Location within Bashkortostan Location within Russia
- Coordinates: 54°11′N 54°10′E
- Country: Russia
- Region: Bashkortostan
- District: Belebeyevsky District
- Time zone: UTC+5:00

Repyevka (Russian: Репьевка) is a rural locality (a village) in Tuzlukushevsky Selsoviet, Belebeyevsky District, Bashkortostan, Russia. The population was 29 as of 2010. There is 1 street.

== Geography ==
Repyevka is located 13 km northeast of Belebey (the district's administrative centre) by road. Ismagilovo is the nearest rural locality.
