= Repyevka, Chishminsky District, Republic of Bashkortostan =

Repyevka Репьевка
- Village
- Location within Bashkortostan Location within Russia
- Coordinates: 54°23′N 55°39′E
- Country: Russia
- Region: Bashkortostan
- District: Chishminsky District
- Time zone: UTC+5:00

Repyevka (Russian: Репьевка) is a rural locality (a village) in Ibragimovsky Selsoviet, Chishminsky District, Bashkortostan, Russia. The population was 21 as of 2010. There is 1 street.

== Geography ==
Repyevka is located 37 km southeast of Chishmy, the district's administrative seat. Pervomaysky is the nearest rural locality.
