= Atlantic modal haplotype =

In human genetics, the Atlantic modal haplotype (AMH) or haplotype 15 is a Y chromosome haplotype of Y-STR microsatellite variations, associated with the Haplogroup R1b. It was discovered prior to many of the SNPs now used to identify subclades of R1b and references to it can be found in some of the older literature. It corresponds most closely with subclade R1b1a2a1a(1) [L11].

The AMH is the most frequently occurring haplotype amongst human males in Atlantic Europe. It is characterized by the following marker alleles:

- DYS388 12
- DYS390 24
- DYS391 11
- DYS392 13
- DYS393 13
- DYS394 14 (also known as DYS19)

It reaches the highest frequencies in the Iberian Peninsula, in Great Britain and Ireland. In the Iberian Peninsula it reaches 70% in Portugal as a whole, more than 90% in NW Portugal and nearly 90% in Galicia (NW Spain), while the highest value is to be found among Spain and the Basques.

One mutation in either direction, would be AMH 1.15+. The AMH 1.15 set of haplotypes is also referred to as the Atlantic modal cluster or AMC.

== See also ==
- Modal haplotype
- Haplotype
- Haplogroup
- Haplogroup R1b
- List of Y-STR markers
