= TSPYL1 =

Protein-coding gene in humans

Identifiers
- Aliases: TSPYL1, TSPYL, TSPY-like 1, TSPY like 1
- External IDs: OMIM: 604714; MGI: 1298395; GeneCards: TSPYL1

Gene location (Human)
| Chr. | Chromosome 6 (human) |
| Band | 6q22.1 | Start | 116,267,760 bp |
| Band | 6q22.1 | End | 116,279,930 bp |

Gene location (Mouse)
| Chr. | Chromosome 10 (mouse) |
| Band | 10|10 B1 | Start | 34,158,186 bp |
| Band | 10|10 B1 | End | 34,161,271 bp |
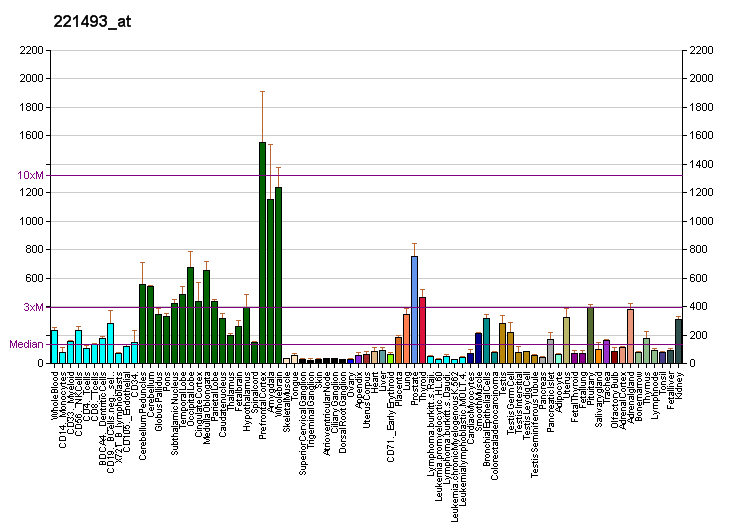
RNA expression pattern
| Bgee | Human / Mouse (ortholog); Top expressed in: germinal epithelium; lateral nuclear group of thalamus; pons; Brodmann area 23; pars compacta; seminal vesicula; external globus pallidus; superior vestibular nucleus; parietal lobe; Skeletal muscle tissue of rectus abdominis / Top expressed in: ventral tegmental area; habenula; dorsomedial hypothalamic nucleus; pontine nuclei; lateral hypothalamus; globus pallidus; Gonadal ridge; paraventricular nucleus of hypothalamus; median eminence; arcuate nucleus; More reference expression data |
| BioGPS | More reference expression data |
Gene ontology
| Molecular function | enzyme binding |
| Cellular component | nucleus; nucleolus |
| Biological process | nucleosome assembly; biological process |
Sources:Amigo / QuickGO
Orthologs
| Databases | NCBI: entry; OMA: entry |
| Species | Human | Mouse |
| Entrez | 7259 | 22110 |
| Ensembl | ENSG00000189241 | ENSMUSG00000047514 |
| UniProt | Q9H0U9 | O88852 |
| RefSeq (mRNA) | NM_003309 | NM_009433 |
| RefSeq (protein) | NP_003300 | NP_033459 |
| Location (UCSC) | Chr 6: 116.27 – 116.28 Mb | Chr 10: 34.16 – 34.16 Mb |
| PubMed search |
- Wikidata
| View/Edit Human | View/Edit Mouse |

Testis-specific Y-encoded-like protein 1 is a protein that in humans is encoded by the TSPYL1 gene.
