= Mosaic loss of chromosome Y =

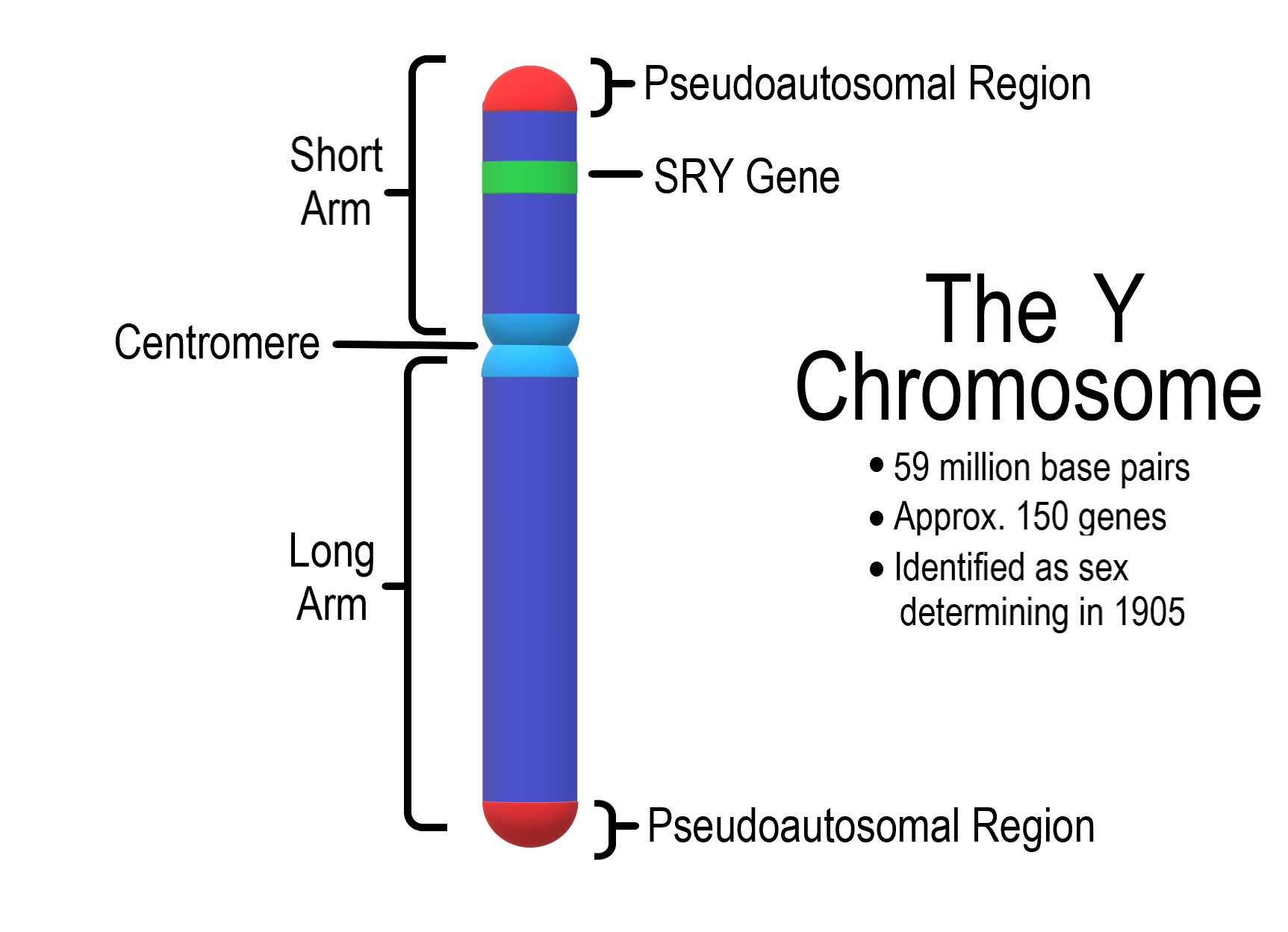
- The Y chromosome.
- Specialty: Medical genetics

Mosaic loss of chromosome Y (mLOY) also known as loss of chromosome Y (LOY), is the phenomenon where the Y chromosome is lost from a subset of cells in a male's body, rather than from all cells. Instead of the expected 46,XY karyotype, the affected cells have a 45,X karyotype due to the loss of the Y chromosome. Other cells retain the original 46,XY karyotype, leading to the mosaic designation for this condition.

== Discovery ==
The occurrence of LOY was discovered in 1963. At this time, it was largely considered a neutral, physiological event associated with normal aging, with little perceived clinical significance. It was not until 2014 when a paradigm shift occurred. Lars A. Forsberg and colleagues from Uppsala University published a landmark study in Nature Genetics. This research, analyzing a large cohort of elderly men, demonstrated a strong association between mLOY in peripheral blood cells and an increased risk of all-cause mortality, as well as a significantly higher risk of non-hematological cancers. This publication marked a crucial turning point, moving mLOY from a "neutral" aging phenomenon to a significant acquired genetic risk factor for common age-related diseases and reduced male longevity.

== Risk factors ==
"Age, genetic variants, ChrY structural aberrations and environmental stressors" such as smoking tobacco are all risk factors for developing LOY. The prevalence increases exponentially with age and more than 40 percent of men over 70 are affected. Unlike loss of autosomal chromosomes, loss of sex chromosomes except the one active X chromosome does not typically cause cell death. Elderly women also experience mosaic loss of chromosome X, but it is less common than LOY.

== Health implications ==
LOY in a small proportion of leukocytes has been associated with a number of diseases such as cancer, Alzheimer's disease, and cardiovascular disease. The exact biological pathways explaining these connections are currently unknown. LOY can also occur in cells of the buccal mucosa and dorsolateral prefrontal cortex.

== Detection and Quantification ==
The accurate detection and quantification of mosaic loss of the Y chromosome (mLOY) are crucial for understanding its prevalence, risk factors, and health implications. Over time, methodologies have evolved from basic microscopic observations to highly sensitive molecular techniques.

The initial discovery of age-related Y chromosome loss in the 1960s was made using karyotyping. Karyotyping has limited sensitivity, it can only detect LOY when a substantial proportion of cells are affected, and cannot precisely quantify the percentage of cells with LOY.

Modern Molecular Techniques include Single Nucleotide Polymorphism (SNP) Arrays, where for mLOY detection, researchers look for a significant reduction in the signal intensity of Y-chromosome-specific markers compared to autosomal (non-sex) chromosomes. Since males typically have one X and one Y chromosome, a loss of the Y chromosome results in a measurable decrease in the Y-specific signal. In Droplet Digital PCR (ddPCR), genes unique to the Y chromosome (e.g., SRY or AMELY) are targeted and their copy number is compared to a reference autosomal gene. Single-Cell Approaches are more powerful for mLOY research because it can identify which specific cell types (e.g., different types of white blood cells like T cells, B cells, or monocytes) are affected by Y chromosome loss and how the gene expression within those individual cells is altered.

Regardless of the method, the core principle for quantifying mLOY involves comparing the dosage of Y chromosome material to a stable reference (like an autosomal chromosome or the X chromosome in males). A ratio significantly below the expected 1:1 (Y:autosome) or 1:1 (Y:X) indicates the proportion of cells that have lost the Y chromosome.
