= Loschbour man =

Cave and archaeological site in Luxembourg

Coordinates: 49°45′46″N 6°16′44″E

Loschbour Man
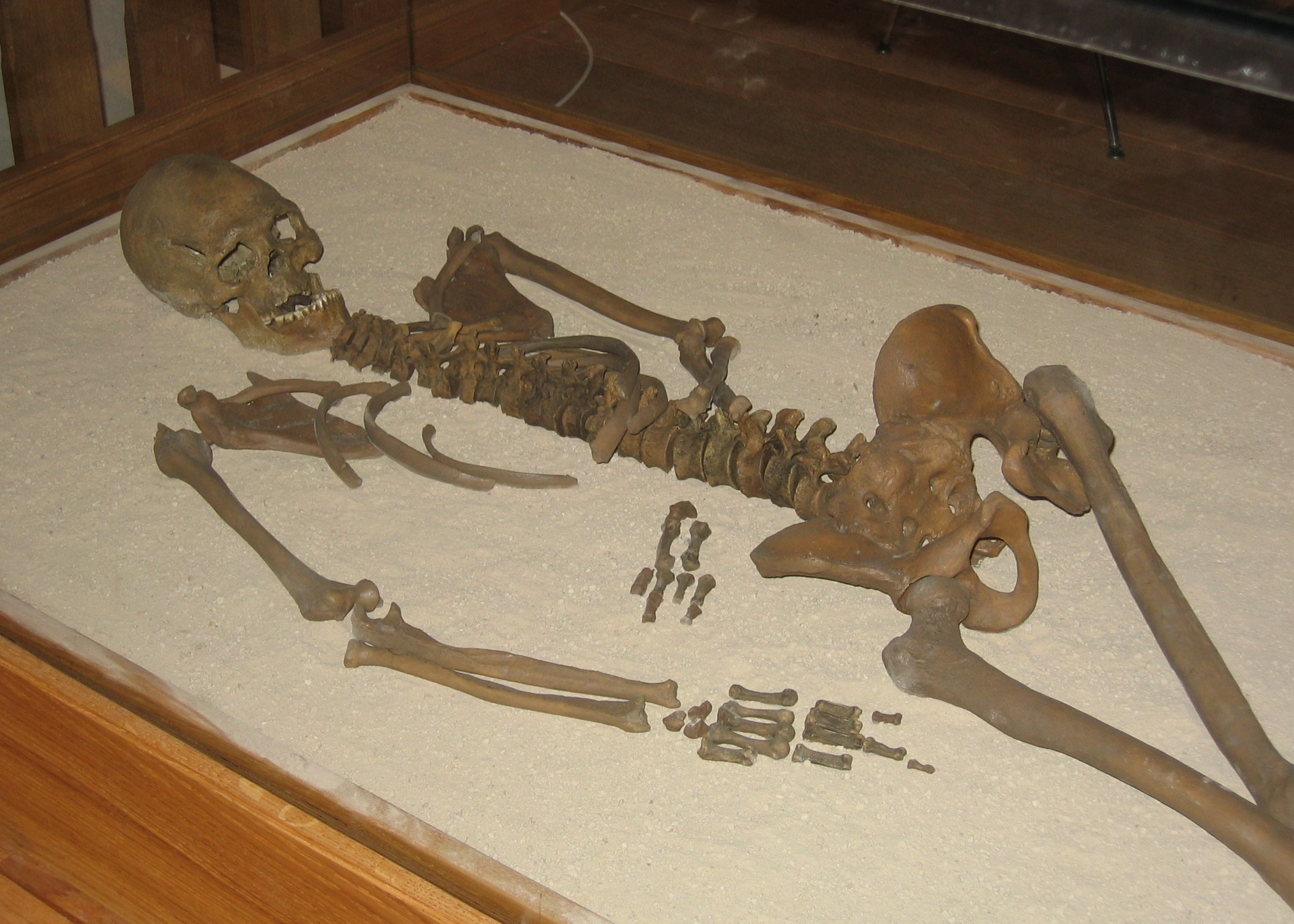
- Died: c. 6000 BC (aged 34-47) now Waldbillig, Echternach, Luxembourg
- Body discovered: 7 October 1935 by Nicolas Thill
- Resting place: Luxembourg City, Canton of Luxembourg, Luxembourg

The Loschbour man (also Loschbur man) is a specimen of Homo sapiens from the European Mesolithic discovered in 1935 in Mullerthal, in the commune of Waldbillig, Luxembourg.

== History ==
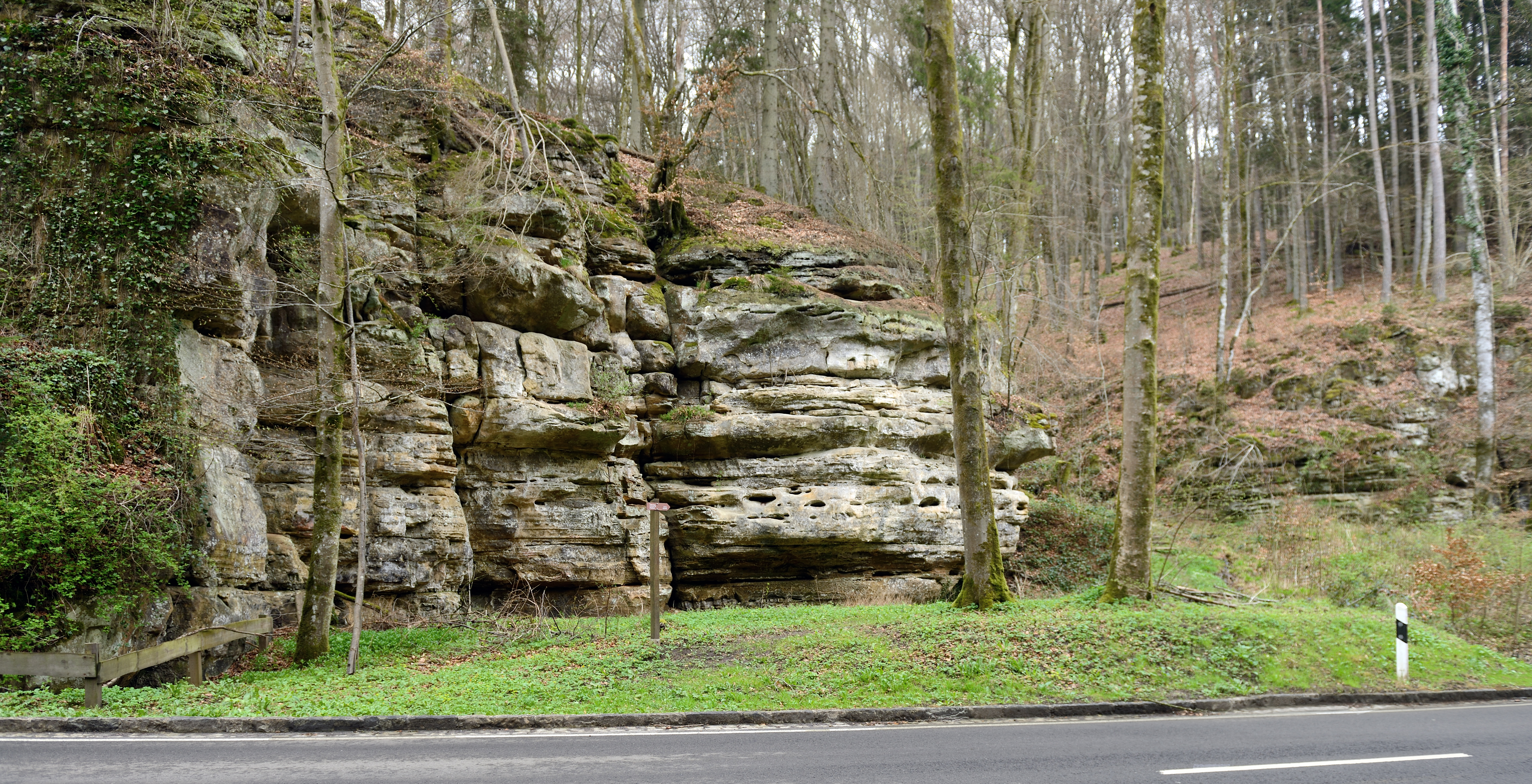
The rock shelter where the skeleton was found

The remains of the Loschbour man, nearly complete, were discovered on 7 October 1935 under a rock shelter in Mullerthal on the banks of the Black Ernz river. It was found by amateur archaeologist and school teacher Nicolas Thill. It is now at the National Museum of Natural History in Luxembourg City.

=== Life ===
The Loschbour man was a hunter-gatherer, and the flint tools used for stalking and killing prey (wild boar and deer) were found by his body. He was found to have been one of the late Western Hunter-Gatherers, soon to be supplanted by more numerous groups of Early European Farmers from Anatolia and Southwestern Europe. According to DNA tests reported in 2014, the Loschbour man was male, and described as having an "intermediate" to light skin tone (90%), brown or black hair (98%), and likely blue eyes (56%). In contrast to 90% of modern Europeans, he was lactose-intolerant. When he died, he was between 34 and 47 years old, c. 1.6 m (5 ft 3 in) tall, and weighed between 58 and 62 kg (128–137 lb).

The cremated remains of another person, likely an adult woman, were found nearby, in a pit which was first excavated in the 1930s and later rediscovered. The bones of the feet were absent, and remains from the thorax underrepresented, and the remaining bones had scrapemarks, evidencing a de-fleshing treatment likely before cremation, including removal of the mandible and scraping of the skull.

== Dating and genetics ==
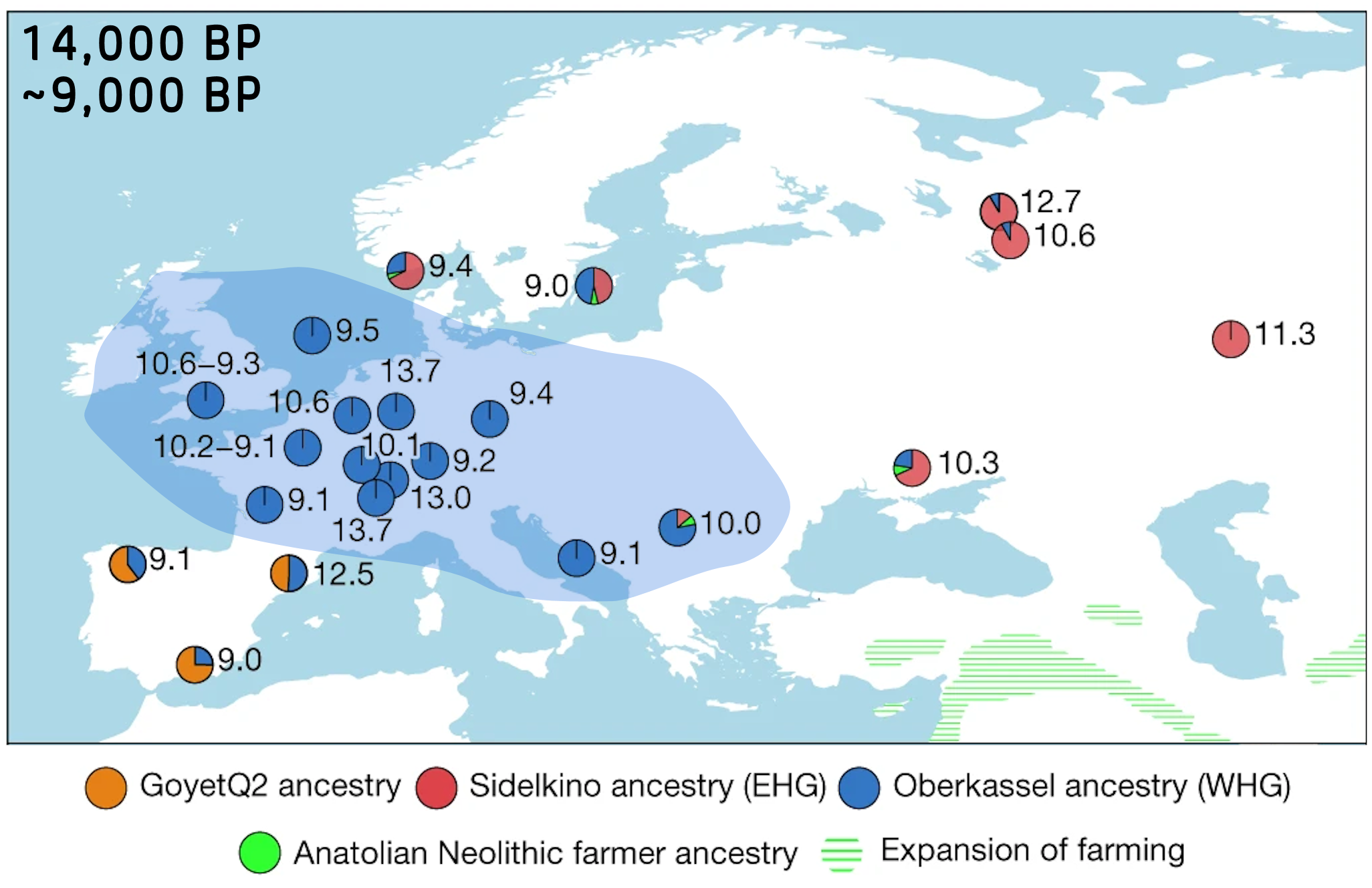
Genetic ancestry of hunter-gatherers dated between 14 ka and 9 ka (WHG highlighted)

The Loschbour man lived more than 8,000 years ago, making the skeleton the oldest human remains found in Luxembourg. He was found to have carried the Y-DNA haplogroup I2a-M423*. DNA testing on two molars indicated the population to which the Loschbour man belonged (Western Hunter-Gatherers), "contributed ancestry to all Europeans but not to near-Easterners".

== Media, science ==
The results of the 2014 DNA testing allowed the Luxembourg Centre National de Recherche Archéologique and the Musée National d'Histoire et d'Art to make a 3D reconstruction of the man. L'homme de Loschbour is a 2012 animated movie, seven minutes long, by Nic Herber. "Redonner vie à l’Homme de Loschbour" was a one-day conference at the National Museum of Natural History, which presented an overview of the results of recent investigations.

== See also ==
- List of human evolution fossils, Holocene
