= Christnach =

Town in eastern Luxembourg

Coordinates: 49°47′N 6°16′E

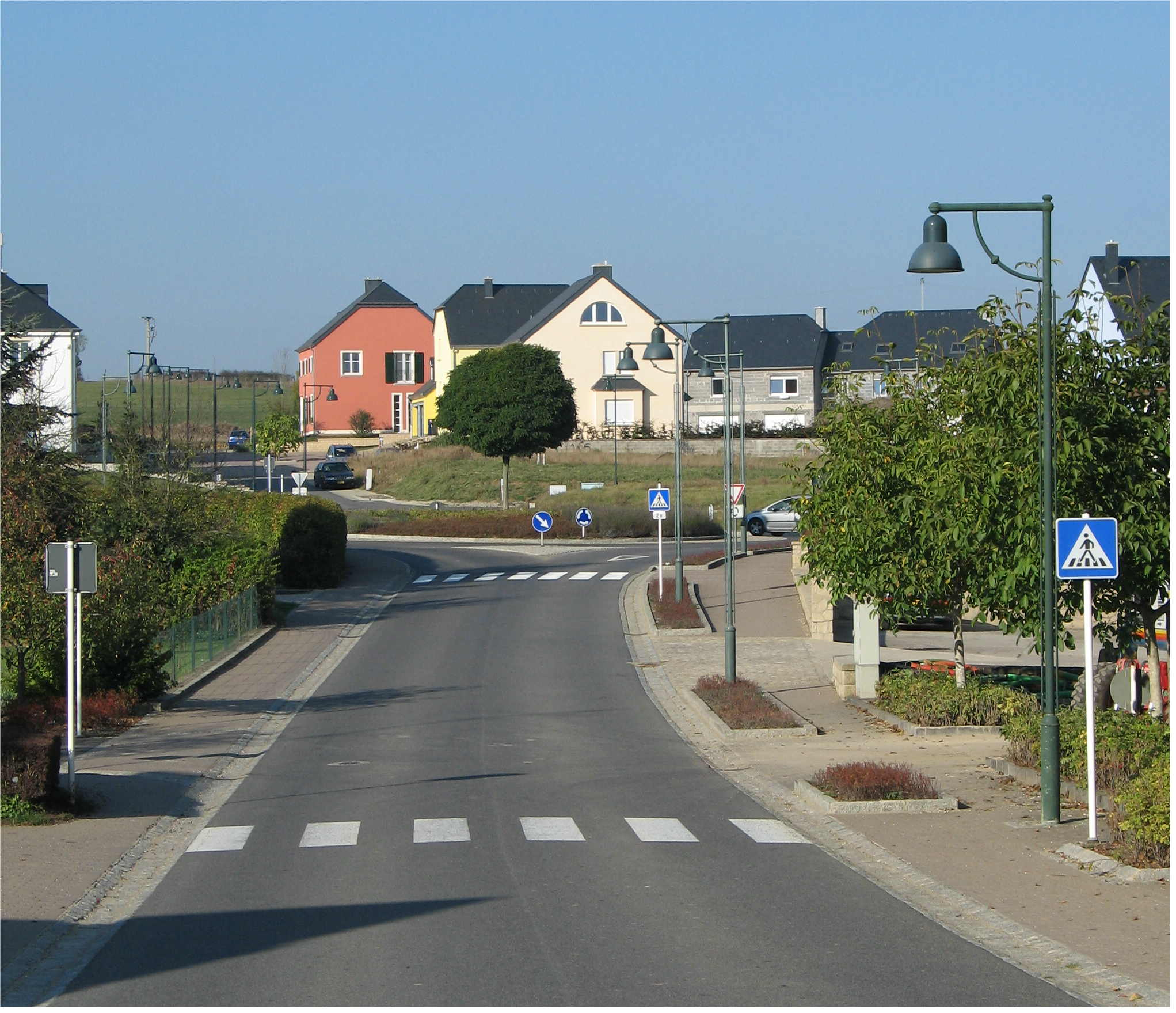

Christnach (German pronunciation: [ˈkʁɪstˌnax]; Luxembourgish: Chrëschtnech) is a small town in the commune of Waldbillig, in eastern Luxembourg. As of September 2026, the town has a population of 861. The town contains a golf course named Golf Christnach, which includes an 18-hole and 9-hole course, along with 2 hiking trails ejecting from the golf course named Nordic Walking Park Mëllerdall 2 and 3. As tourist highlights, Nordic Walking Park Mëllerdall 2 is 10.2 kilometers (6.3 miles) long and contains the "model" village of Christnach. Nordic Walking Park Mëllerdall 3 is 11 kilometers (6.8 miles) long and contains the birthplace of Michel Rodange.
