= National Museum of Natural History, Luxembourg =

Museum in Luxembourg City, Luxembourg

Coordinates: 49°36′35″N 6°08′08″E

National Museum of Natural History
- Nationalmusée fir Naturgeschicht
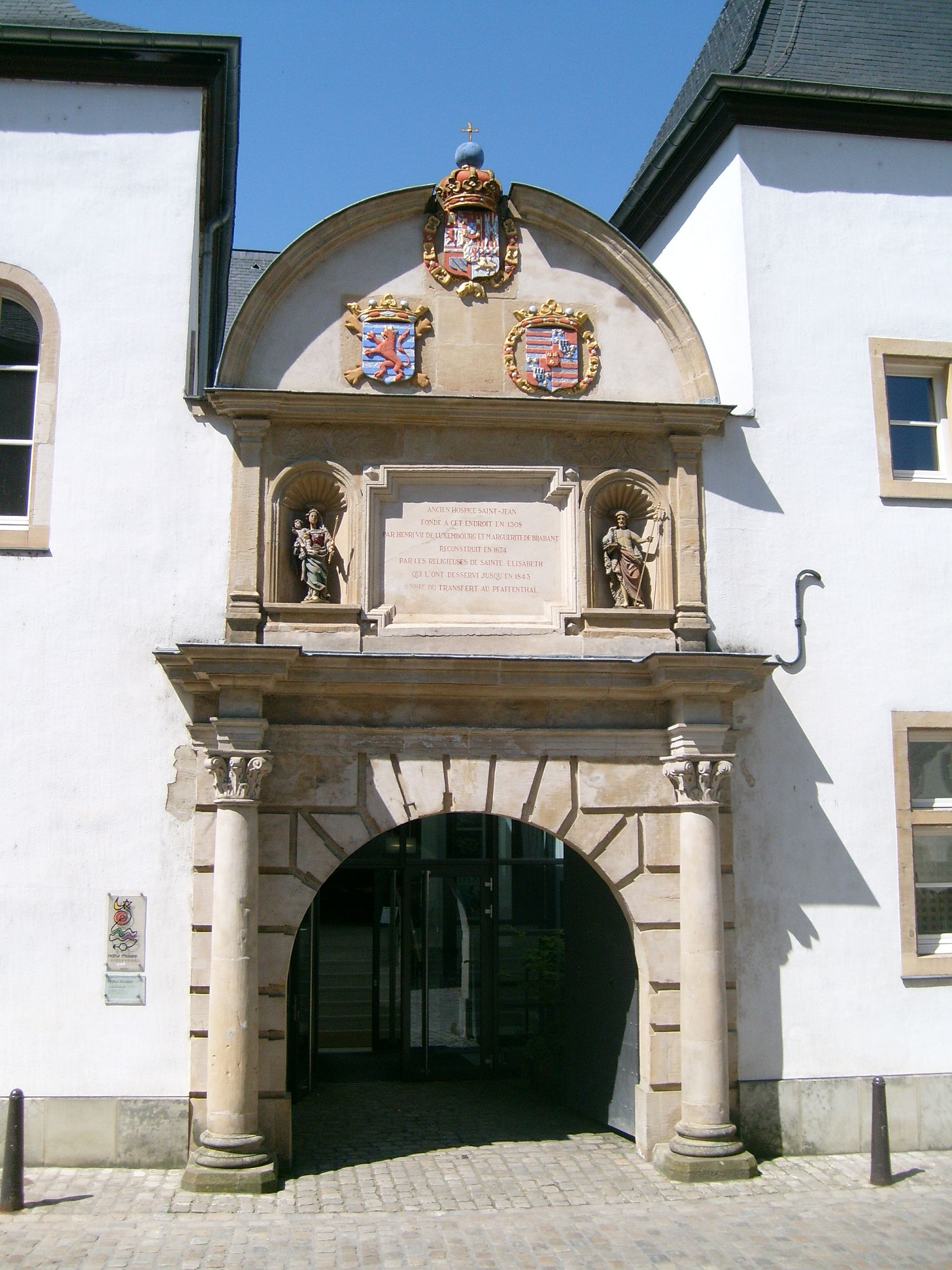
- Location: Luxembourg City
- Type: Natural history
- Website: www.mnhn.lu

The National Museum of Natural History (Luxembourgish: Nationalmusée fir Naturgeschicht, French: Musée national d'histoire naturelle, German: Nationalmuseum für Naturgeschichte) is a natural history museum in Luxembourg City, in southern Luxembourg. The museum is located in the Grund quarter on the eastern bank of the Alzette river, next to the Neumünster Abbey cultural centre.

The museum is composed of eight separate scientific sections, spanning the natural sciences: botany, ecology, geology and mineralogy, geophysics and astrophysics, palaeontology, vertebrate zoology, and invertebrate zoology.

== History ==
The Society of the Natural Sciences was established in 1850, under the patronage of Prince Henry, the newly appointed Governor of Luxembourg representing Grand Duke William III. The society's primary aim was the promotion of the natural sciences and natural history to the general population. To achieve this, the government put at the society's disposal a section of the city Athenaeum, now the National Library. Opening its doors in 1854, this area hosted a number of cabinets displaying fossil specimens, spread across three rooms. After almost four decades of this arrangement, pressure for display area caused the museum to move into its own premises, at the Vauban Barracks in Pfaffenthal, in 1892. However, these were criticised for being unattractive to visitors, hence undermining the museum's attempts to promote natural history to the general public.

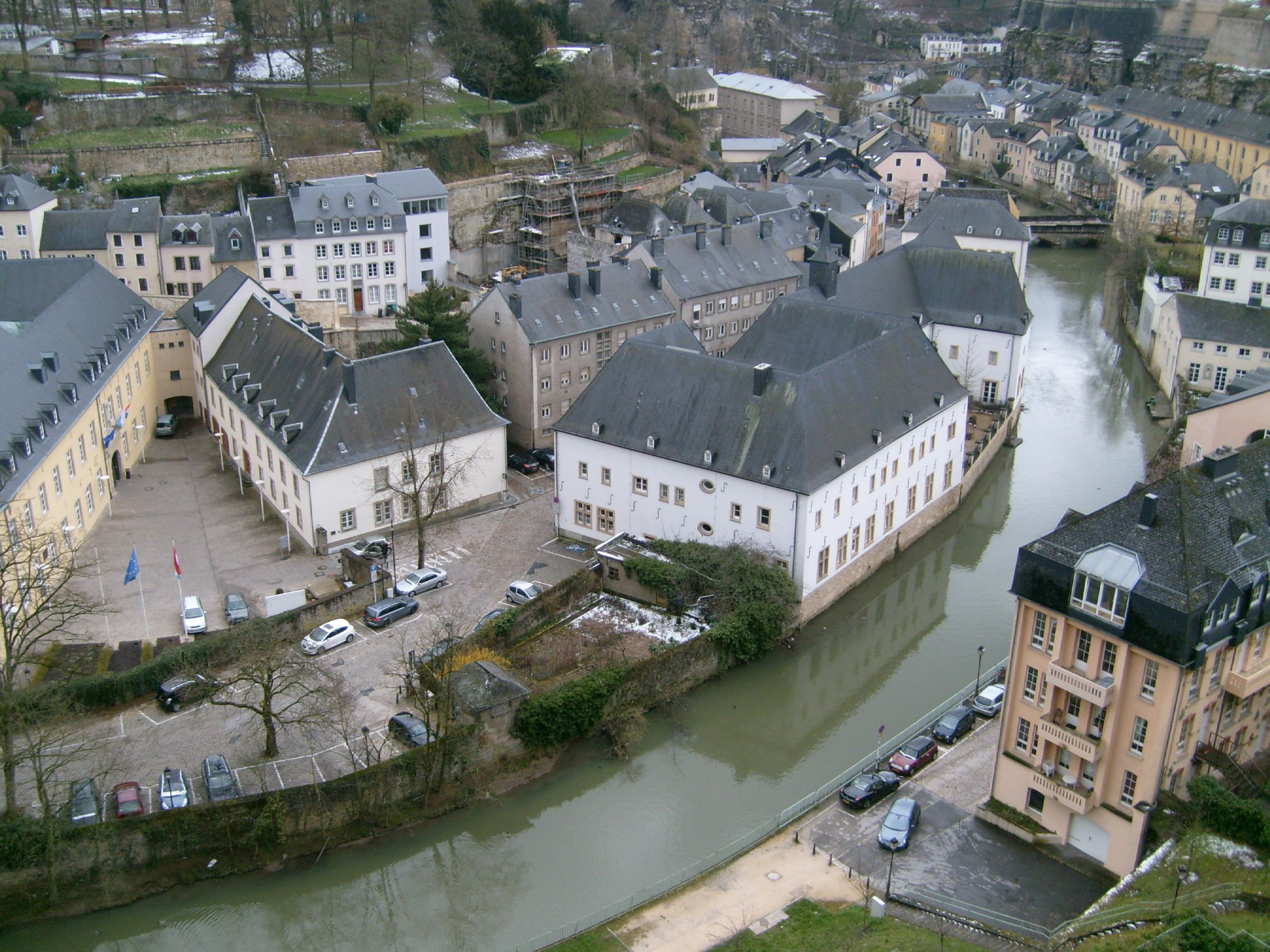
View from the Corniche (upper city): the museum consists of the white buildings in the center of the image. The left L-shaped white building hosts the research facilities.

In 1922, the museum moved once again. The new site was the Old Gendarmerie, on the Fishmarket, in the historic heart of Luxembourg City, which the museum shared with the National Museum of History and Art. Purchased by the government, the building, along with a neighbouring house, were initially unsuitable for the housing of the museum, and the state embarked upon a renovation programme, during which time, the collections were closed to the general public, causing much public anger. The renovations had almost been completed by the outbreak of the Second World War, but the German occupation caused the museum to move again temporarily to protect its collections. Despite the war, the building in Fishmarket was virtually undamaged, allowing the museum to re-occupy the premises immediately. In 1946, a temporary installation was opened, marking the museum's return to its original purpose, thirty-four years after its closure. By 1952, the last room had been opened, marking a return to normal operation.

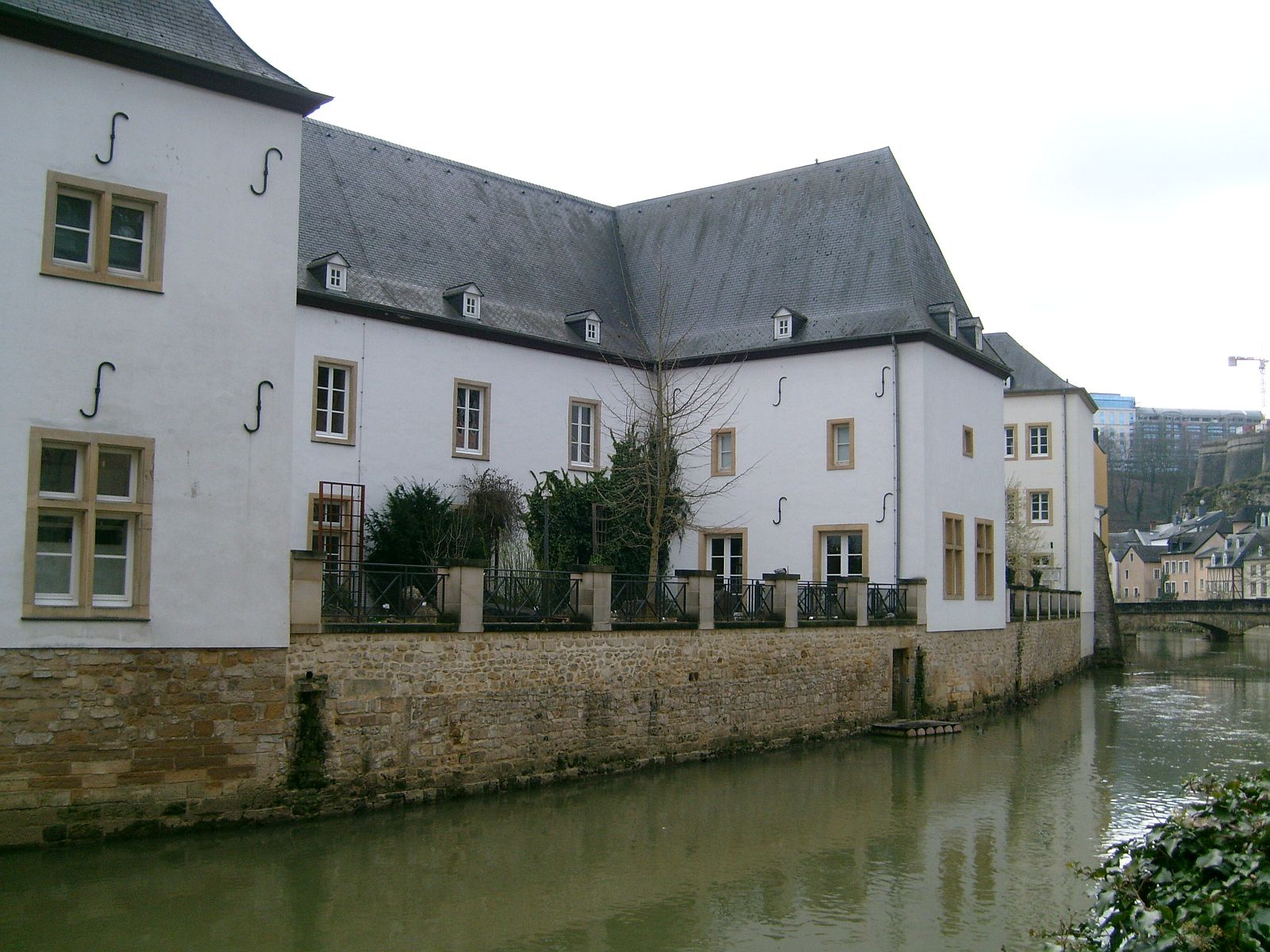
Backside of the museum along the river Alzette.

It was in the decades following the war that the museum diversified away from its core activities, engaging in fields such as geophysics and astrophysics; such was the museum's commitment to these fields that it was the owner of the first electron microscope in the country. However, the expansion of the museum into these additional fields put added pressure on the space of the museum in Fishmarket, particularly as the National Museum of History and Art was also expanding. After a decade-long search for a suitable new site, on 11 January 1990, the Chamber of Deputies agreed to restore Saint Jean's Hospice, in Grund.

The new site was opened in June 1996, spread across three buildings, each dedicated to a different aspect of the museum's functions: collection displays, teaching classrooms, and research laboratories.

== Notable holdings ==
- Loschbour man

== See also ==
- List of museums in Luxembourg
