= Haller, Luxembourg =

Village in Luxembourg

Haller Haler
- Village
- Location in Luxembourg
- Coordinates: 49°49′11″N 6°16′56″E
- Country: Luxembourg
- Commune: Waldbillig

Population (2024)
  - Total: 427

Haller (German pronunciation: [ˈhalɐ]; Luxembourgish: Haler) is a village in the commune of Waldbillig, in eastern Luxembourg. As of September 2026, the village has a population of 419.
