= Western hunter-gatherer =

Archaeogenetic name for an ancestral genetic component

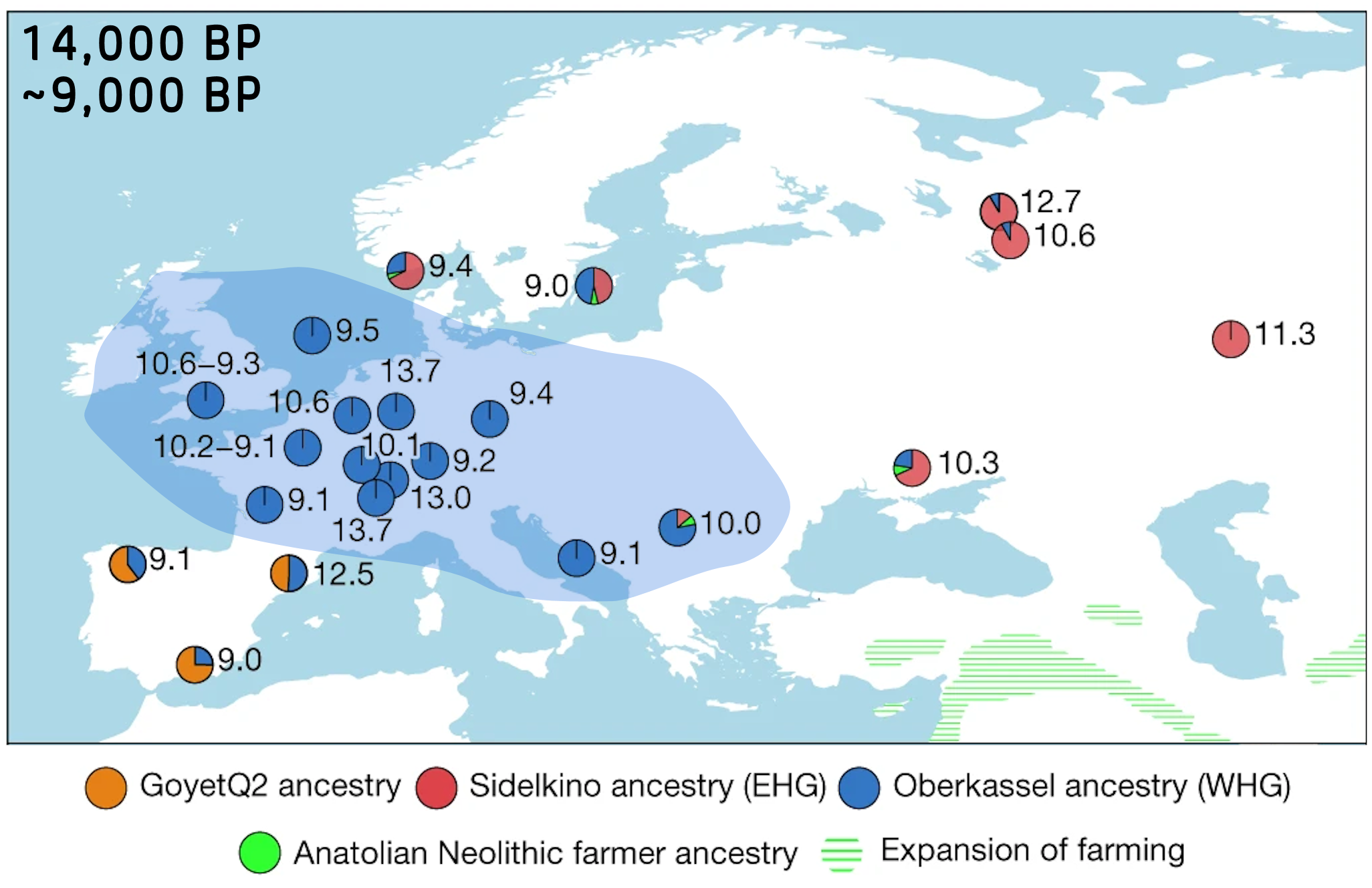
- Genetic ancestry of hunter-gatherers in Europe between 14 ka and 9 ka, with the main area of Western hunter-gatherers (WHG) in blue. Individual numbers correspond to calibrated sample dates.

In archaeogenetics, western hunter-gatherer (WHG, also known as west European hunter-gatherer, western European hunter-gatherer or Oberkassel cluster) (c. 15,000–5,000 BP) is a distinct ancestral component of modern Europeans, representing descent from a population of Mesolithic hunter-gatherers present across much of Western Europe, Central Europe and parts of Southeastern Europe, from the British Isles in the west to the Carpathians in the east, following the retreat of the ice sheet of the Last Glacial Maximum. It is closely associated and sometimes considered synonymous with the late Upper Paleolithic Villabruna cluster, named after remains found in Ripari Villabruna cave in northern Italy, known from the terminal Pleistocene of Europe, which is largely ancestral to later WHG populations.

WHGs appear to share some genetic affinities with people in West Asia not found in earlier Upper Paleolithic European hunter-gatherers. Their precise relationships to other groups are somewhat obscure, with the origin of the Villabruna cluster likely somewhere in the vicinity of the Balkans. The Villabruna cluster (which is associated with the Epigravettian and other related archaeological cultures of the late Upper Paleolithic) had expanded into the Italian and Iberian Peninsulas by approximately 19,000 years ago, with the WHG cluster subsequently expanding across Western Europe at the end of the Pleistocene around 14–12,000 years ago, largely replacing the Magdalenian peoples who previously dominated the region. These Magdalenian peoples largely descended from earlier Western European Cro-Magnon groups that had arrived in the region over 30,000 years ago, prior to the Last Glacial Maximum.

WHGs constituted one of the main genetic groups in the postglacial period of early Holocene Europe, along with eastern hunter-gatherers (EHG) in Eastern Europe. The border between WHGs and EHGs ran roughly from the lower Danube, northward along the western forests of the Dnieper towards the western Baltic Sea. EHGs primarily consisted of a mixture of WHG-related and Ancient North Eurasian (ANE) ancestry. Scandinavia was inhabited by Scandinavian hunter-gatherers (SHGs), which were a mixture between WHG and EHG. In the Iberian Peninsula, early Holocene hunter-gathers consisted of a mixture of WHG and Magdalenian Cro-Magnon (GoyetQ2) ancestry.

Once the main population throughout Europe, the WHGs were largely replaced by successive expansions of Early European Farmers (EEFs) of Anatolian origin during the early Neolithic, who generally carried a minor amount of WHG ancestry due to admixture with WHG groups during their European expansion. Among modern-day populations, WHG ancestry is the most common among populations of the eastern Baltic region.

WHGs lacked the light skin genes found in modern Europeans and it has been suggested that they were dark skinned and had light coloured eyes.

== Research ==
Western hunter-gatherers (WHG) are recognised as a distinct ancestral component contributing to the ancestry of most modern Europeans. Most Europeans can be modeled as a mixture of WHG, EEF, and Western Steppe Herders (WSHs) from the Pontic–Caspian steppe. WHGs also contributed ancestry to other ancient groups such as Early European Farmers (EEF), who were, however, mostly of Anatolian descent. With the Neolithic expansion, EEF came to dominate the gene pool in most parts of Europe, although WHG ancestry had a resurgence in Western Europe from the Early Neolithic to the Middle Neolithic.

=== Origin and expansion into continental Europe ===
WHGs represent a major population shift within Europe at the end of the Ice Age, probably a population expansion into continental Europe, from Southeastern European or West Asian refugia. It is thought that their ancestors separated from eastern Eurasians around 40,000 BP, and from Ancient North Eurasians (ANE) prior to 24,000 BP (the estimated age date of the Mal'ta boy). This date was subsequently put further back in time by the findings of the Yana Rhinoceros Horn Site to around 38kya, shortly after the divergence of West-Eurasian and East-Eurasian lineages. Vallini et al. 2022 argues that the dispersal and split patterns of West Eurasian lineages was not earlier than c. 38,000 years ago, with older Initial Upper Paleolithic European specimens, such as those found in the Zlaty Kun, Peștera cu Oase and Bacho Kiro caves, being unrelated to Western hunter-gatherers but closer to Ancient East Eurasians or basal to both.

The relationships of the WHG/Villabruna cluster to other Paleolithic human groups in Europe and West Asia are obscure and subject to conflicting interpretations. A 2022 study proposed that the WHG/Villabruna population genetically diverged from hunter-gatherers in the Middle East and the Caucasus around 26,000 years ago, during the Last Glacial Maximum. WHG genomes display higher affinity for ancient and modern Middle Eastern populations when compared against earlier Paleolithic Europeans such as Gravettians. The affinity for ancient Middle Eastern populations in Europe increased after the Last Glacial Maximum, correlating with the expansion of WHG (Villabruna or Oberkassel) ancestry.

There is also evidence for bi-directional geneflow between WHG and Middle Eastern populations as early as 15,000 years ago. WHG associated remains belonged primarily to the human Y-chromosome haplogroups I-M170 with a lower frequency of C-F3393 (specifically the clade C-V20/C1a2), which has been found commonly among earlier Paleolithic European remains such as Kostenki-14 and Sungir. The paternal haplogroup C-V20 can still be found in men living in modern Spain, attesting to this lineage's longstanding presence in Western Europe. The Villabruna cluster also carried the Y-haplogroup R1b (R1b-L754), derived from the Ancient North Eurasian haplogroup R*, indicating "an early link between Europe and the western edge of the Steppe Belt of Eurasia." Their mitochondrial chromosomes belonged primarily to haplogroup U5.

A 2023 study proposed that the Villabruna cluster emerged from an admixture between a Věstonice-related lineage and a West Eurasian lineage that's basal to the split between Kostenki-14 and Goyet Q116-1 genomes. The Věstonice-related lineage itself can be modeled as a mixture of BK-1653-related lineages and Sunghir-related lineages, with the former being responsible for the high genetic affinities between the Villabruna and Věstonice clusters.^{(see supplemental material)}

Another genetic study models WHG as being predominantly derived from an ancestral source related to the Caucasus Upper Palaeolithic individual from Kotias Klde cave, who can be modeled as a mixture of Upper Paleolithic West Eurasian hunter-gatherer ancestry (76%) and 'ghost' basal Eurasian populations (24%), which was first observed in Neolithic West Asian individuals.

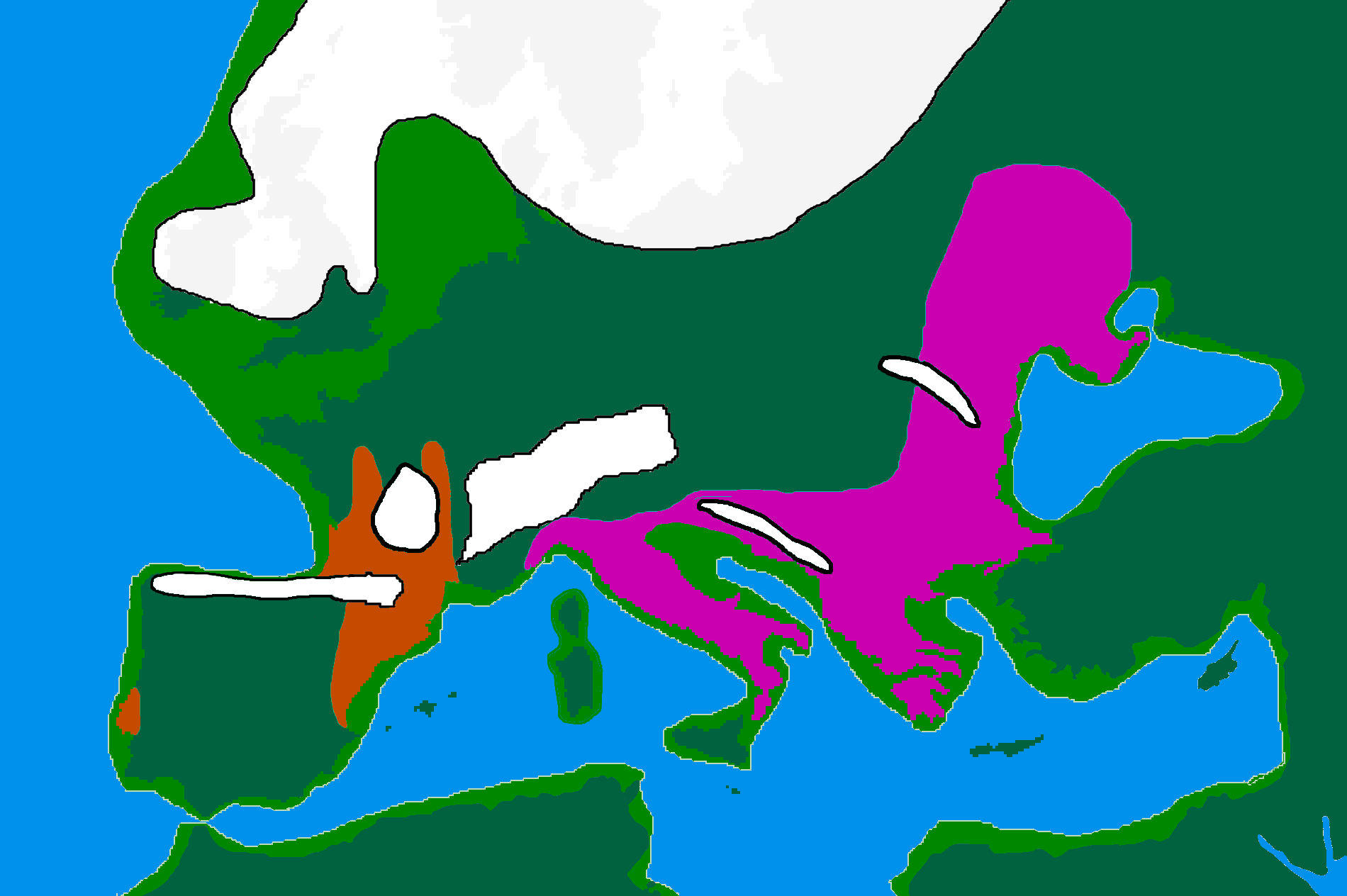
A map of Europe showing the Last Glacial Maximum refugia, c. 20,000 years ago Solutrean culture Epigravettian culture

The earliest known individuals of predominantly WHG/Villabruna ancestry in Europe are known from Italy, dating to around 17,000 years ago, although an individual from El Mirón cave in northern Spain from about 19,000 years ago had about 43% Villabruna ancestry. While not confirmed, the Villabruna cluster was probably present earlier in the Balkans region than elsewhere in Southern Europe. Early WHG/Villabruna populations are associated with the Epigravettian archaeological culture, which largely replaced populations associated with the Magdalenian culture about 14,000 years ago. The Magdalenian-associated Goyet-Q2 cluster itself primarily descends from earlier Solutrean and western Gravettian-producing groups in France and Spain.

A 2023 study found that relative to earlier Western European Cro-Magnon populations like the Gravettians, the Magdalenian-associated Goyet-Q2 cluster carried significant (c. 30%) Villabruna ancestry even prior to the major expansion of WHG-related groups north of the Alps. This study found that relative to earlier members of the Villabruna cluster from Italy, WHG-related groups which appeared north of the Alps beginning around 14,000 years ago carried around 25% ancestry from the Goyet-Q2 cluster, or alternatively 10% from the western Gravettian associated Fournol cluster. This paper proposed that WHG should be named the Oberkassel cluster, after one of the oldest WHG individuals found north of the Alps.

All Oberkassel-related individuals can be modeled as a mixture of Arene Candide 16 (a 13,000 year old skeleton from Northern Italy representative of Villabruna ancestry) (75%) and Goyet-Q2 (25%) ancestries or Arene Candide 16 (90%) and Fournol 85 (10%) ancestries. Arene Candide 16 is cladal with Epigravettian Europeans whilst Goyet-Q2 and Fournol 85 show affinities with GoyetQ116-1. The study suggests that Oberkassel ancestry was mostly already formed, possibly around the west side of the Alps, before expanding to Western and Central Europe and Britain, where sampled WHG individuals are genetically homogeneous. This is in contrast to the arrival of Villabruna and Oberkassel ancestry to Iberia, which seems to have involved repeated admixture events with local populations carrying high levels of Goyet-Q2 ancestry. This, and the survival of specific Y-DNA haplogroup C1 clades previously observed among early European hunter-gatherers, suggests relatively higher genetic continuity in southwest Europe during this period.

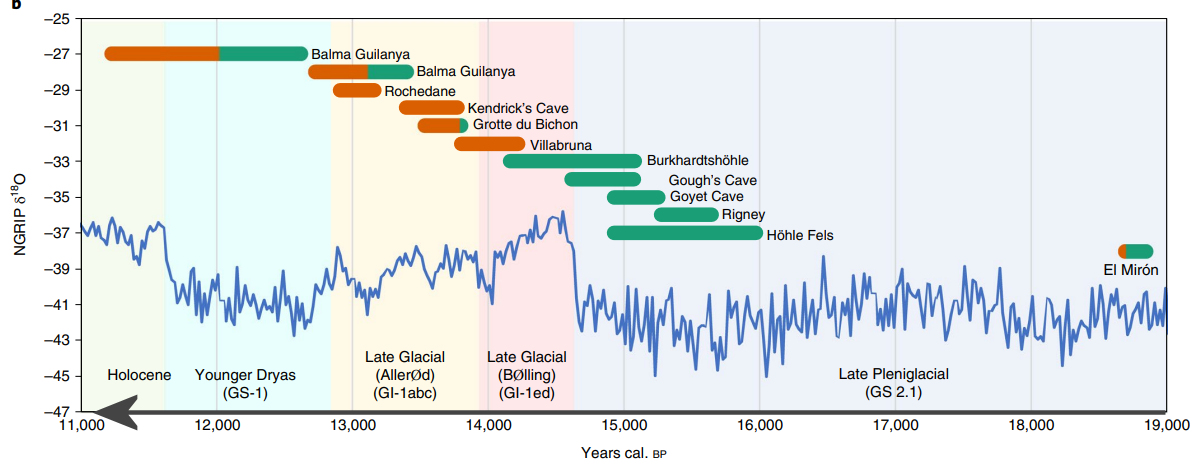
The transition from Magdalenian Goyet ancestry (green , Goyet Q2) to Western Hunter Gatherer (WHG) Villabruna ancestry (orange ) in European sites, according to timeline and climate evolution.

=== Interaction with other populations ===
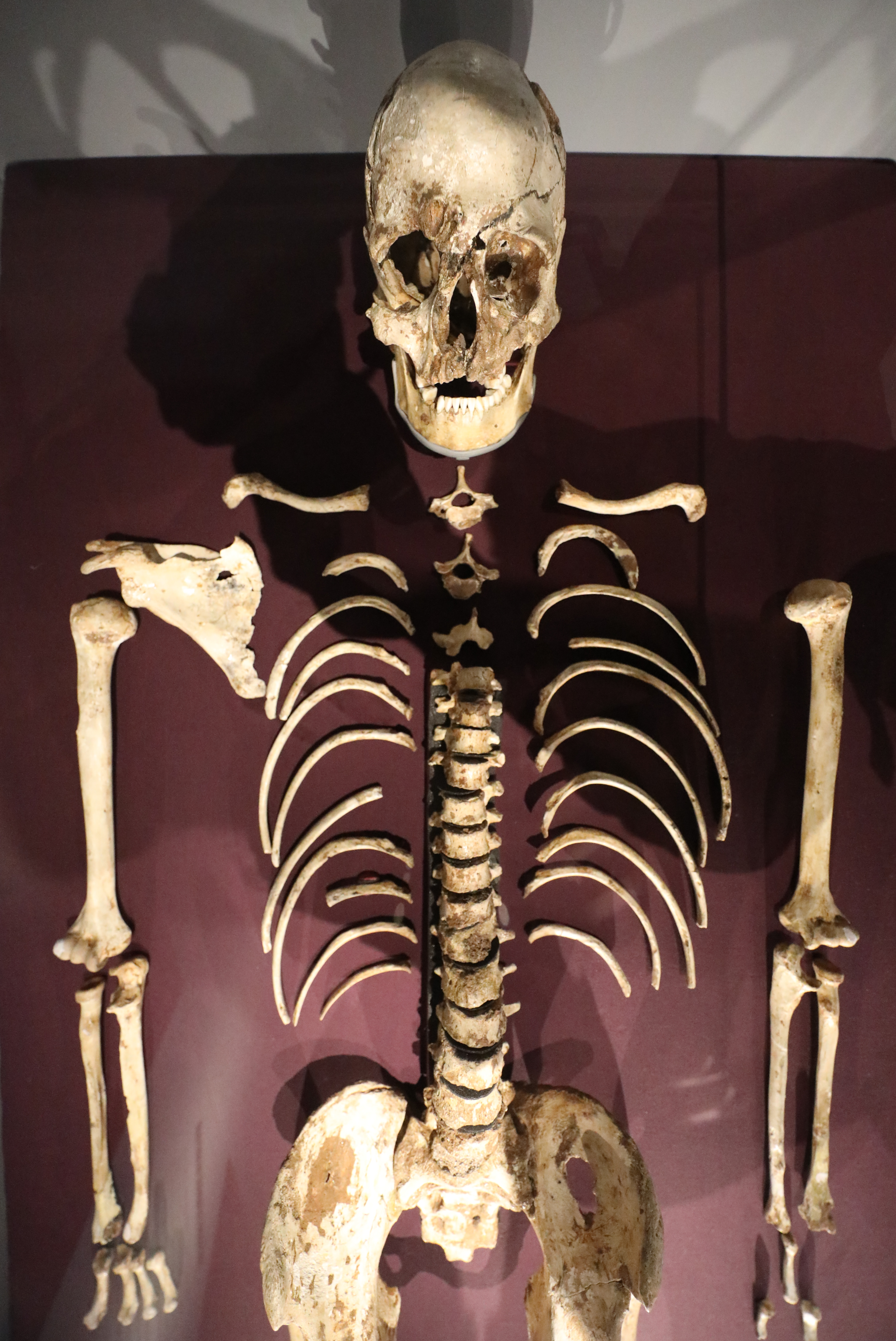
Cheddar Man, found in Great Britain, had a genotype similar to other western hunter-gatherers.

The WHG were also found to have contributed ancestry to populations on the borders of Europe such as early Anatolian farmers and Ancient Northwestern Africans, as well as to other European groups such as eastern hunter-gatherers (EHG). The relationship of WHGs to the EHGs remains inconclusive. EHGs are modeled to derive varying degrees of ancestry from a WHG-related lineage, ranging from merely 25% to up to 91%, with the remainder being linked to geneflow from Paleolithic Siberians (ANE) and perhaps Caucasus hunter-gatherers. Another lineage known as the Scandinavian hunter-gatherers (SHGs) were found to be a mix of EHGs and WHGs. (Note: "Eastern Hunter Gatherers (EHG) derive 3/4 of their ancestry from the ANE ... Scandinavian hunter-gatherers (SHG) are a mix of EHG and WHG; and WHG are a mix of EHG and the Upper Paleolithic Bichon from Switzerland.")

In the Iberian Peninsula early Holocene hunter-gathers consisted of populations with a mixture of WHG and Magdalenian Cro-Magnon (GoyetQ2) ancestry.

People of the Mesolithic Kunda culture and the Narva culture of the eastern Baltic were a mix of WHG and EHG, showing the closest affinity with WHG. Samples from the Ukrainian Mesolithic and Neolithic were found to cluster tightly together between WHG and EHG, suggesting genetic continuity in the Dnieper Rapids for a period of 4,000 years. The Ukrainian samples belonged exclusively to the maternal haplogroup U, which is found in around 80% of all European hunter-gatherer samples.

People of the Pit–Comb Ware culture (CCC) of the eastern Baltic were closely related to EHG. Unlike most WHGs, the WHGs of the eastern Baltic did not receive European farmer admixture during the Neolithic. Modern populations of the eastern Baltic thus harbor a larger amount of WHG ancestry than any other population in Europe.

SHGs have been found to contain a mix of WHG components who had likely migrated into Scandinavia from the south, and EHGs who had later migrated into Scandinavia from the northeast along the Norwegian coast. This hypothesis is supported by evidence that SHGs from western and northern Scandinavia had less WHG ancestry (ca 51%) than individuals from eastern Scandinavia (ca. 62%). The WHGs who entered Scandinavia are believed to have belonged to the Ahrensburg culture. EHGs and WHGs displayed lower allele frequencies of SLC45A2 and SLC24A5, which cause depigmentation, and OCA/Herc2, which causes light eye color, than SHGs.

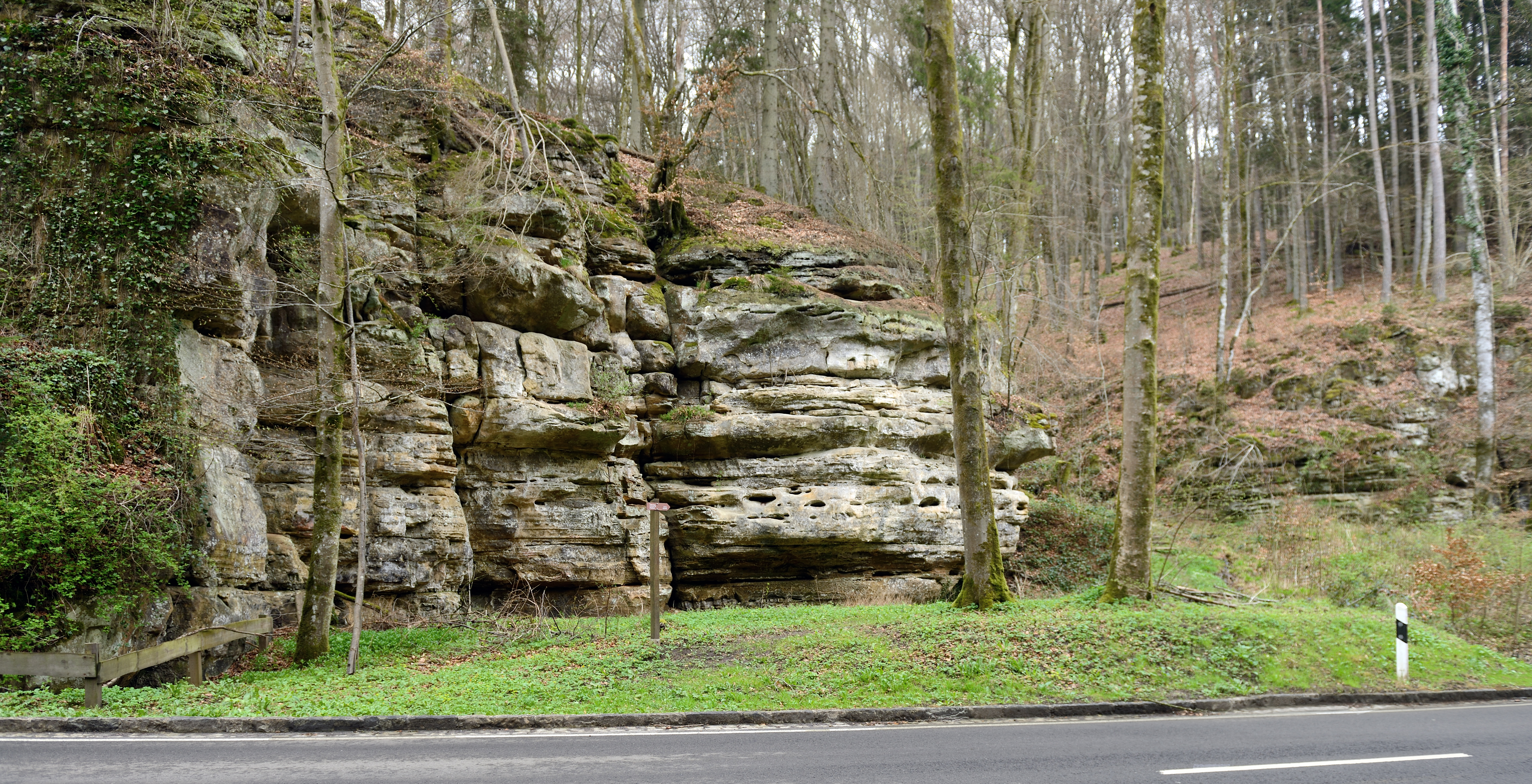
The rock shelter where the skeleton of the Loschbour man (c. 8,000 BP) was found

The DNA of eleven WHGs from the Upper Palaeolithic and Mesolithic in Western Europe, Central Europe and the Balkans was analyzed, with regards to their Y-DNA haplogroups and mtDNA haplogroups. The analysis suggested that WHGs were once widely distributed from the Atlantic coast in the West, to Sicily in the South, to the Balkans in the Southeast, for more than six thousand years.

The study included an analysis of a large number of individuals of prehistoric Eastern Europe. Thirty-seven samples were collected from Mesolithic and Neolithic Ukraine (9500-6000 BC). These were determined to be an intermediate between EHG and SHG, although WHG ancestry in this population increased during the Neolithic. Samples of Y-DNA extracted from these individuals belonged exclusively to R haplotypes (particularly subclades of R1b1) and I haplotypes (particularly subclades of I2). mtDNA belonged almost exclusively to U (particularly subclades of U5 and U4).

A large number of individuals from the Zvejnieki burial ground, which mostly belonged to the Kunda culture and Narva culture in the eastern Baltic, were analyzed. These individuals were mostly of WHG descent in the earlier phases, but over time EHG ancestry became predominant. The Y-DNA of this site belonged almost exclusively to haplotypes of haplogroup R1b1a1a and I2a1. The mtDNA belonged exclusively to haplogroup U (particularly subclades of U2, U4 and U5).

Forty individuals from three sites of the Iron Gates Mesolithic in the Balkans were also analyzed. These individuals were estimated to be of 85% WHG and 15% EHG descent. The males at these sites carried exclusively haplogroup R1b1a and I (mostly subclades of I2a) haplotypes. mtDNA belonged mostly to U (particularly subclades of U5 and U4). People of the Balkan Neolithic were found to harbor 98% Anatolian ancestry and 2% WHG ancestry. By the Chalcolithic, people of the Cucuteni–Trypillia culture were found to harbor about 20% hunter-gatherer ancestry, which was intermediate between EHG and WHG. People of the Globular Amphora culture were found to harbor ca. 25% WHG ancestry, which is significantly higher than Middle Neolithic groups of Central Europe.

==== Replacement by Neolithic farmers ====
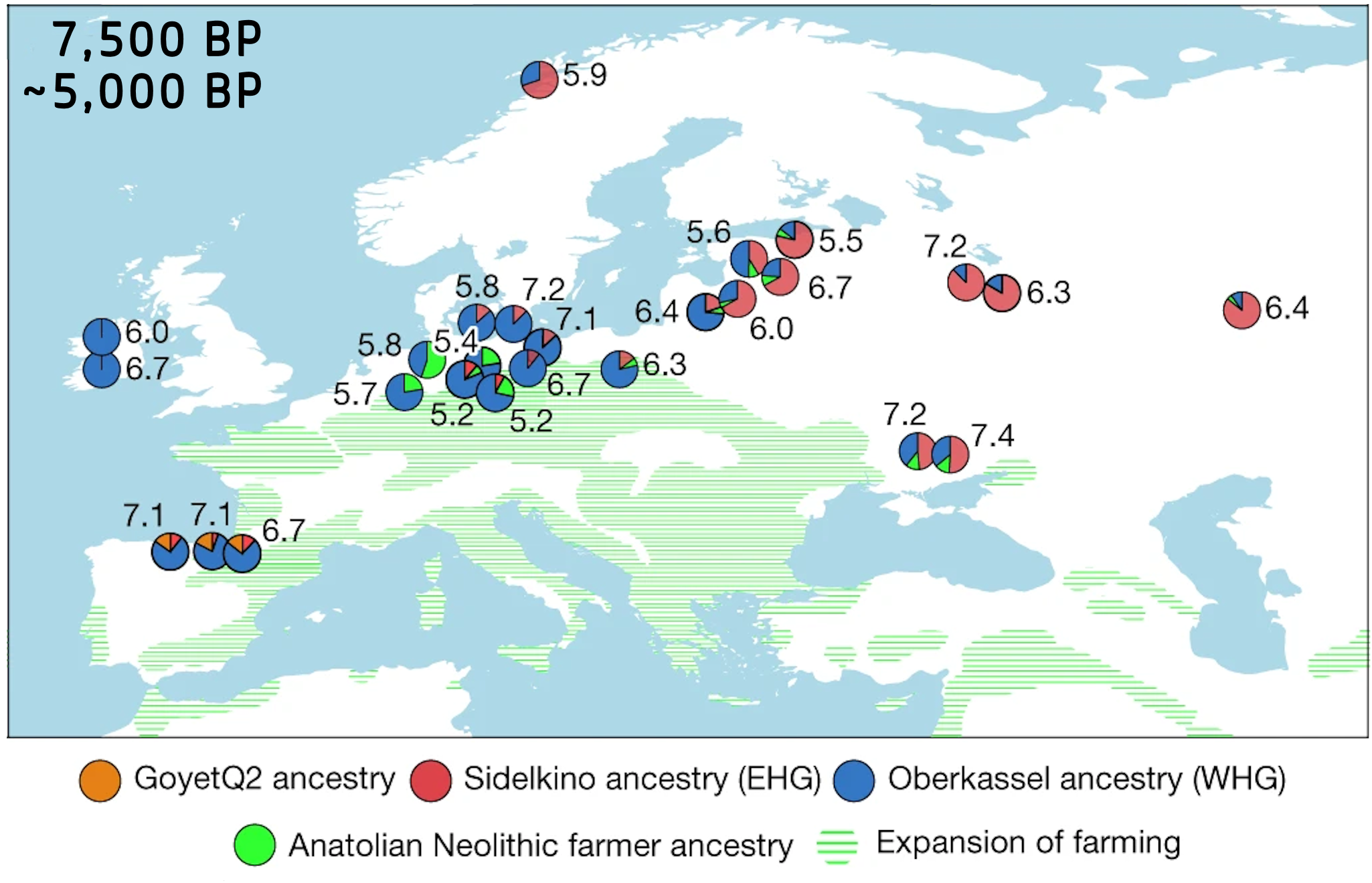
Residual genetic ancestry of European hunter-gatherers during the European Neolithic, between 7.5 ka and 5 ka BP (c. 5,500~3,000 BC)

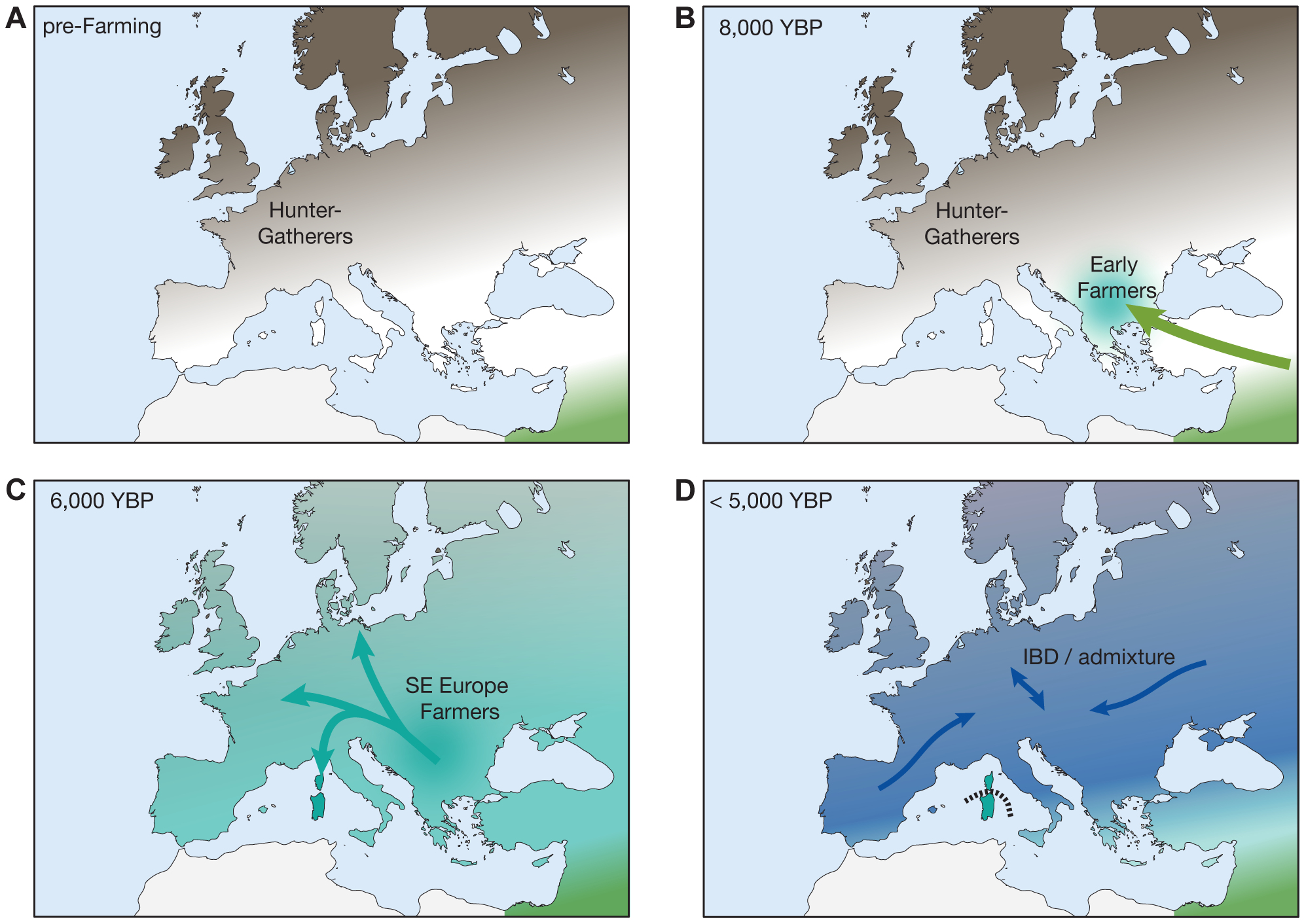
A simplified model for the demographic history of Europeans during the Neolithic period and the Neolithic Revolution which introduced agriculture.

A seminal 2014 study first identified the contribution of three main components to modern European lineages: the Western Hunter Gatherers (WHG, in proportions of up to 50% in Northern Europeans), the Ancient North Eurasians (ANE, Upper Paleolithic Siberians later associated with the later Indo-European expansion, present in proportions up to 20%), and the Early European Farmers (EEF, agriculturists of mainly Near Eastern origin who migrated to Europe from circa 8,000 BP, now present in proportions from around 30% in the Baltic region to around 90% in the Mediterranean). The Early European Farmer (EEF) component was identified based on the genome of a woman buried c. 7,000 years ago in a Linear Pottery culture grave in Stuttgart, Germany.

This 2014 study found evidence for genetic mixing between WHG and EEF throughout Europe, with the largest contribution of EEF in Mediterranean Europe (especially in Sardinia, Sicily, Malta and among Ashkenazi Jews), and the largest contribution of WHG in Northern Europe and among Basque people.

Since 2014, further studies have refined the picture of interbreeding between EEF and WHG. In a 2017 analysis of 180 ancient DNA datasets of the Chalcolithic and Neolithic periods from Hungary, Germany and Spain, evidence was found of a prolonged period of interbreeding. Admixture took place regionally, from local hunter-gatherer populations, so that populations from the three regions (Germany, Iberia and Hungary) were genetically distinguishable at all stages of the Neolithic period, with a gradually increasing ratio of WHG ancestry of farming populations over time.

This suggests that after the initial expansion of early farmers, there were no further long-range migrations substantial enough to homogenize the farming population, and that farming and hunter-gatherer populations existed side by side for many centuries, with ongoing gradual admixture throughout the 5th to 4th millennia BC, rather than a single admixture event on initial contact. Admixture rates varied geographically; in the late Neolithic, WHG ancestry in farmers in Hungary was at around 10%, in Germany around 25% and in Iberia as high as 50%.

Analysis of remains from the Grotta Continenza in Italy showed that out of six remains, three buried between c. 10,000 BC and 7000 BC belonged to I2a-P214; and two-times the maternal haplogroups U5b1 and one U5b3. Around 6000 BC, the WHGs of Italy were almost completely genetically replaced by EEFs (two G2a2) and one Haplogroup R1b, although WHG ancestry slightly increased in subsequent millennia.

Neolithic individuals in the British Isles were close to Iberian and Central European Early and Middle Neolithic populations, modeled as having about 75% ancestry from EEF with the rest coming from WHG in continental Europe. They subsequently replaced most of the WHG population in the British Isles without mixing much with them.

The WHG are estimated to have contributed between 20-30% ancestry to Neolithic EEF groups throughout Europe. Specific adaptions against local pathogens may have been introduced via the Mesolithic WHG admixture into Neolithic EEF populations.

A study on Mesolithic hunter-gatherers from Denmark found that they were related to contemporary Western hunter-gatherers, and are associated with the Maglemose, Kongemose and Ertebølle cultures. They displayed "genetic homogeneity from around 10,500 to 5,900 calibrated years before present", until "Neolithic farmers with Anatolian-derived ancestry arrived". The transition to the Neolithic period was "very abrupt and resulted in a population turnover with limited genetic contribution from local hunter-gatherers. The succeeding Neolithic population has been associated with the Funnelbeaker culture.

== Physical appearance ==
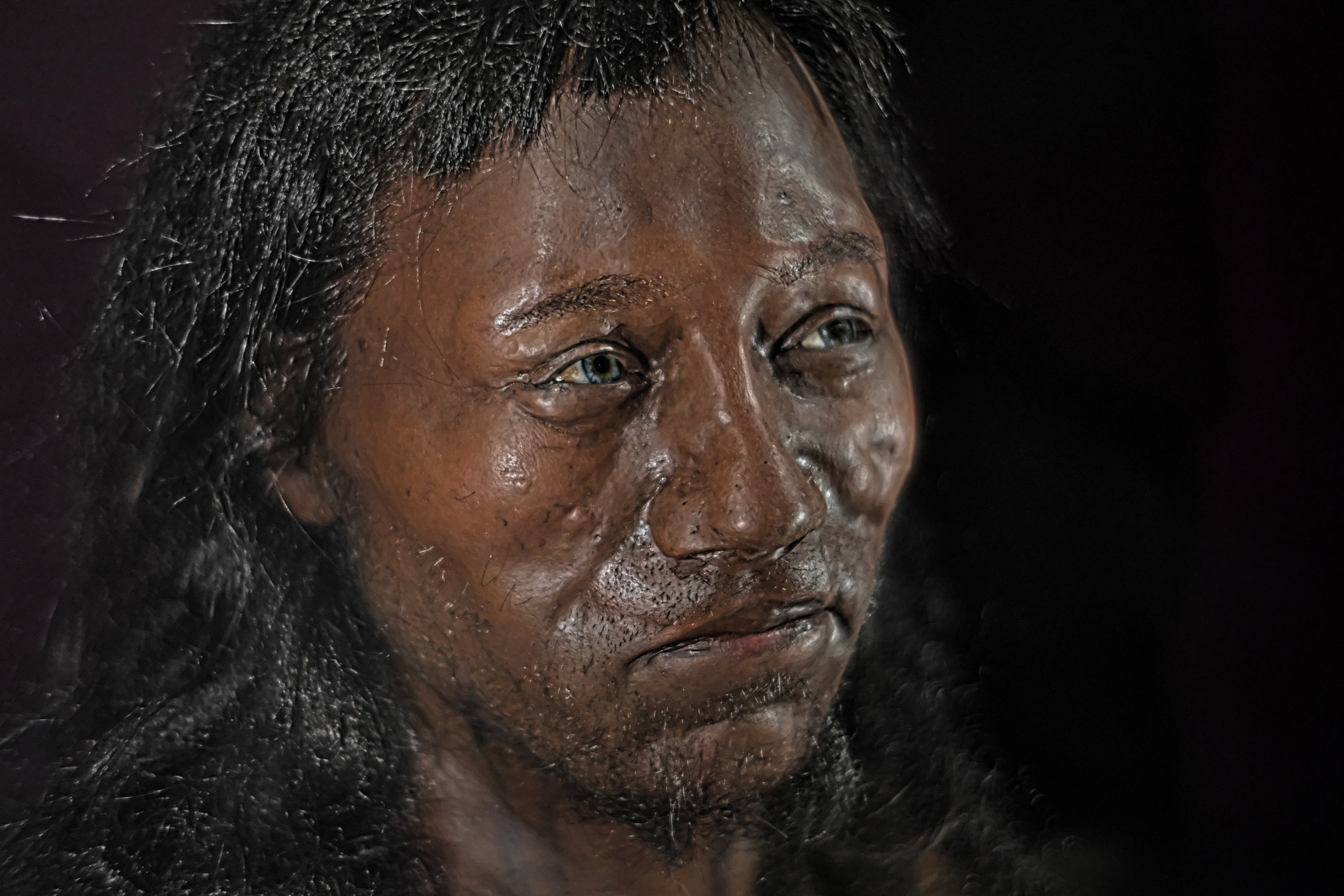
A hypothetical reconstruction of the head of Cheddar Man, found in England (carbon-dated c. 8540-8230 BC). The model is based on skull shape and DNA analysis, representing one possible interpretation of his appearance based on available skeletal and genetic evidence.

According to David Reich, DNA analysis has shown that Western Hunter Gatherers were typically dark skinned, dark haired, and blue eyed. The dark skin was due to their Out-of-Africa origin (all Homo sapiens populations having had initially dark skin), while the blue eyes were the result of a variation in their OCA2 gene, which caused iris depigmentation.

Archaeologist Graeme Warren has said that their skin color ranged from olive to black, and speculated that they may have had some regional variety of eye and hair colors. This is strikingly different from the distantly related eastern hunter-gatherers (EHG)—who have been suggested to be light-skinned, brown-eyed or blue eyed and dark-haired or light-haired.

Two WHG skeletons with incomplete SNPs, La Braña and Cheddar Man, are predicted to have had dark or dark to black skin, whereas two other WHG skeletons with complete SNPs, "Sven" and Loschbour man, are predicted to have had dark or intermediate-to-dark and intermediate skin, respectively. (Note: These predictions were obtained using a multinomial logistic regression model based on a panel of 36 carefully selected SNPs with a low sensitivity of 0.26 for classifying intermediate skin (compared to 0.99 and 0.90 for white and black skin, respectively). The accuracy of the model used could be further improved with "additional (but currently unknown) SNP predictors once identified via future GWAS".) Spanish biologist Carles Lalueza-Fox said the La Braña-1 individual had dark skin, "although we cannot know the exact shade".

According to a 2020 study, the arrival of Early European Farmers (EEFs) from western Anatolia from 8500 to 5000 years ago, along with Western Steppe Herders during the Bronze Age, caused a rapid evolution of European populations towards lighter skin and hair. Admixture between hunter-gatherer and agriculturist populations was apparently occasional, but not extensive.

A 2024 research into the genomic ancestry and social dynamics of the last hunter-gatherers of Atlantic France has stated that "phenotypically, we find some diversity during the Late Mesolithic in France", at which two of the WHG's sequenced in the study "likely had pale to intermediate skin pigmentation", but "most individuals carry the dark skin and blue eyes characteristic of WHGs" of the studied samples.

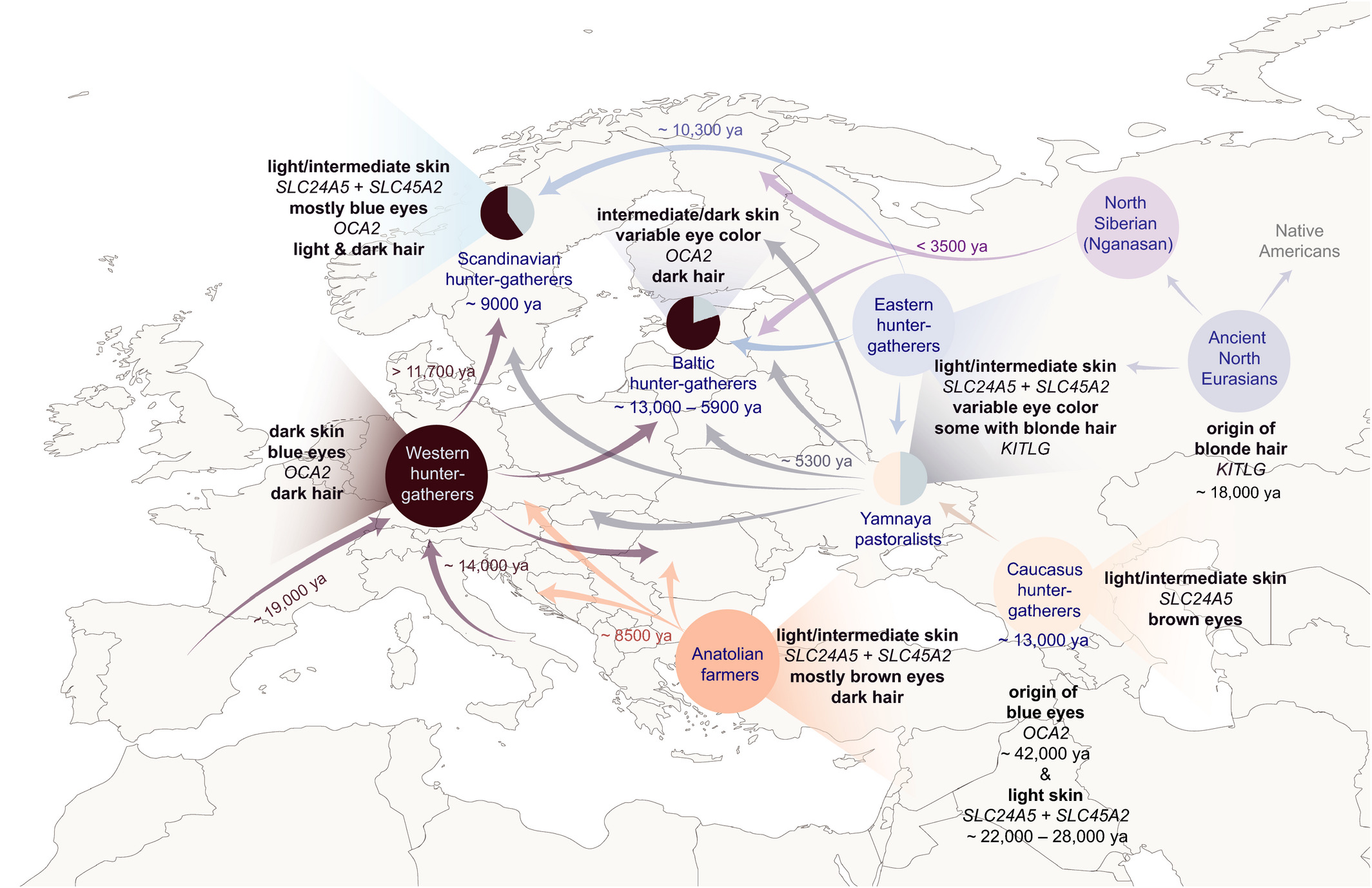
The evolution of Upper Paleolithic and Neolithic phenotypes in Eurasia. Dark-skinned western hunter-gatherers lived in Western Europe, and expanded to some extent towards north and eastern Europe.

=== Pigmentation reconstruction limits ===
Several researchers have cautioned against definitive reconstructions of Mesolithic skin phenotypes based on genetic prediction models trained on present-day populations. Quillen et al. (2019) acknowledge studies that generally show that "lighter skin color was uncommon across much of Europe during the Mesolithic", including studies regarding the "dark or dark to black" predictions for the Cheddar Man, but warn that "reconstructions of Mesolithic and Neolithic pigmentation phenotype using loci common in modern populations should be interpreted with some caution, as it is possible that other as yet unexamined loci may have also influenced phenotype."

Geneticist Susan Walsh of Indiana University–Purdue University Indianapolis, who co-developed the HIrisPlex-S system used in the Cheddar Man project, clarified that the results represent a probability profile rather than a certainty, stating, "we simply don't know his skin colour." Geneticist Brenna Henn similarly argued that current genetic knowledge is insufficient to accurately predict the skin colour of prehistoric individuals, as the genetic architecture of pigmentation is more complex than previously assumed and many contributing variants remain unidentified.

German biochemist Johannes Krause emphasized that while it is certain WHGs lacked the specific mutations responsible for light skin in modern Europeans, it remains unknown whether their skin pigmentation more closely resembled populations from present-day Central Africa or the more intermediate tones of the Arab region.

== Bibliography ==
- Anthony, David W. (2019b). "Ancient DNA, Mating Networks, and the Anatolian Split". In Serangeli, Matilde; Olander, Thomas (eds.). Dispersals and Diversification: Linguistic and Archaeological Perspectives on the Early Stages of Indo-European. BRILL. pp. 21–54. ISBN 978-90-04-41619-2.
- Antonio, Margaret L.; et al. (8 November 2019). "Ancient Rome: A genetic crossroads of Europe and the Mediterranean". Science. 366 (6466). American Association for the Advancement of Science: 708–714. Bibcode:2019Sci...366..708A. doi:10.1126/science.aay6826. PMC 7093155. PMID 31699931.
- Günther, Thorsten (1 January 2018). "Population genomics of Mesolithic Scandinavia: Investigating early postglacial migration routes and high-latitude adaptation". PLOS Biology. 16 (1) e2003703. PLOS. doi:10.1371/journal.pbio.2003703. PMC 5760011. PMID 29315301.
- Haak, Wolfgang (11 June 2015). "Massive migration from the steppe was a source for Indo-European languages in Europe". Nature. 522 (7555). Nature Research: 207–211. arXiv:1502.02783. Bibcode:2015Natur.522..207H. doi:10.1038/nature14317. PMC 5048219. PMID 25731166.
- Jones, Eppie R. (20 February 2017). "The Neolithic Transition in the Baltic Was Not Driven by Admixture with Early European Farmers". Current Biology. 27 (4). Cell Press: 576–582. Bibcode:2017CBio...27..576J. doi:10.1016/j.cub.2016.12.060. PMC 5321670. PMID 28162894.
- Kashuba, Natalija (15 May 2019). "Ancient DNA from mastics solidifies connection between material culture and genetics of mesolithic hunter–gatherers in Scandinavia". Communications Biology. 2 (105) 185. Nature Research. doi:10.1038/s42003-019-0399-1. PMC 6520363. PMID 31123709.
- Lazaridis, Iosif (17 September 2014). "Ancient human genomes suggest three ancestral populations for present-day Europeans". Nature. 513 (7518). Nature Research: 409–413. arXiv:1312.6639. Bibcode:2014Natur.513..409L. doi:10.1038/nature13673. hdl:11336/30563. PMC 4170574. PMID 25230663.
- Lazaridis, Iosif (25 July 2016). "Genomic insights into the origin of farming in the ancient Near East". Nature. 536 (7617). Nature Research: 419–424. Bibcode:2016Natur.536..419L. doi:10.1038/nature19310. PMC 5003663. PMID 27459054.
- Mathieson, Iain (23 November 2015). "Genome-wide patterns of selection in 230 ancient Eurasians". Nature. 528 (7583). Nature Research: 499–503. Bibcode:2015Natur.528..499M. doi:10.1038/nature16152. PMC 4918750. PMID 26595274.
- Mathieson, Iain (21 February 2018). "The Genomic History of Southeastern Europe". Nature. 555 (7695). Nature Research: 197–203. Bibcode:2018Natur.555..197M. doi:10.1038/nature25778. PMC 6091220. PMID 29466330.
- Mittnik, Alisa (30 January 2018). "The genetic prehistory of the Baltic Sea region". Nature Communications. 16 (1) 442. Nature Research. Bibcode:2018NatCo...9..442M. doi:10.1038/s41467-018-02825-9. PMC 5789860. PMID 29382937.
- Saag, Lehti (24 July 2017). "Extensive Farming in Estonia Started through a Sex-Biased Migration from the Steppe". Current Biology. 27 (14). Cell Press: 2185–2193. Bibcode:2017CBio...27E2185S. doi:10.1016/j.cub.2017.06.022. PMID 28712569.
