= Hospice Saint-Jean =

Hospice in the rue Münster in the Grund district of Luxembourg City

Coordinates: 49°36′35″N 6°08′08″E

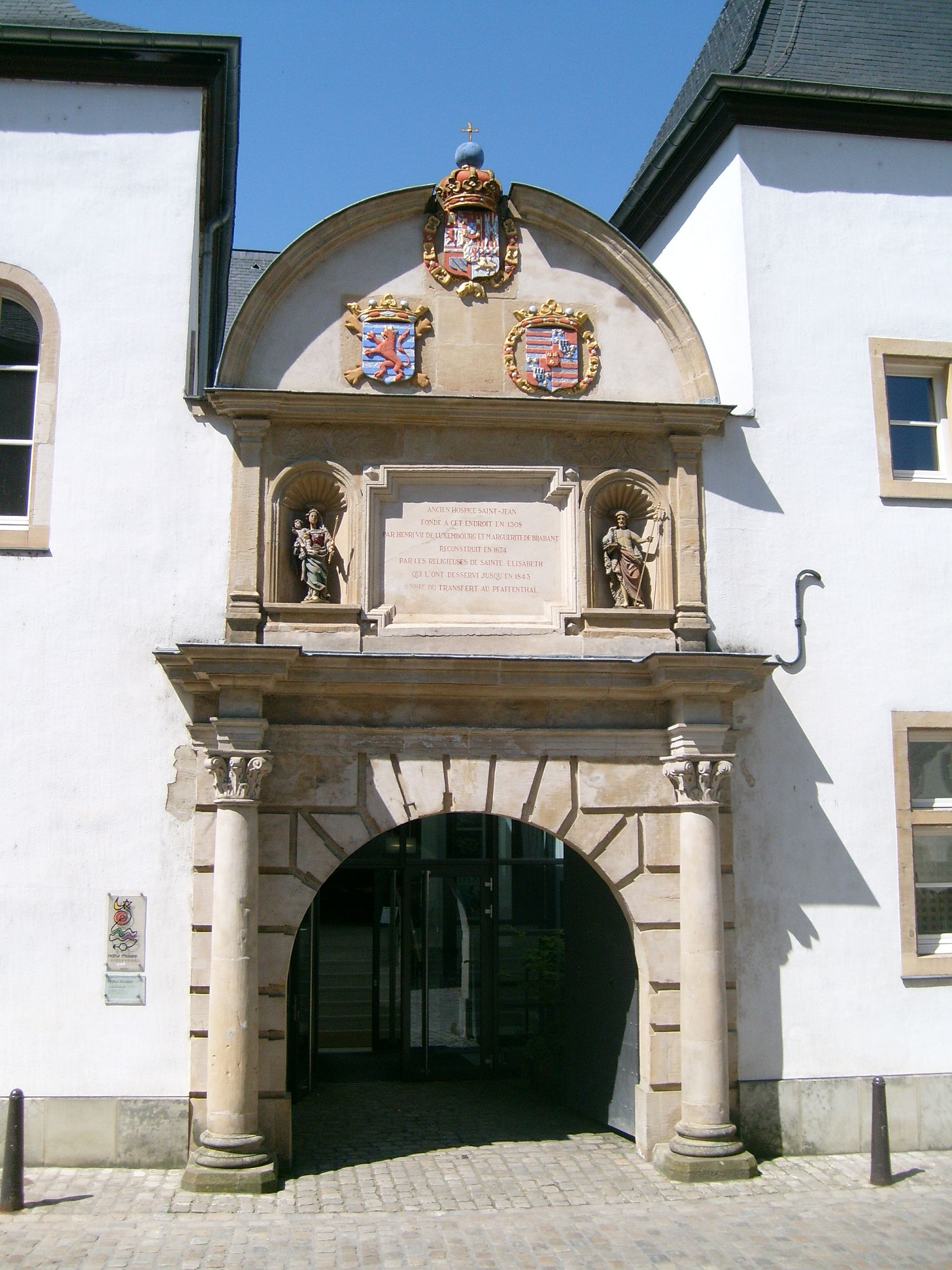
Portal of the Hospice Saint-Jean

The Hospice Saint-Jean was a hospice in the rue Münster in the Grund district of Luxembourg City. Only city citizens were admitted.

In 1997, the National Museum of Natural History opened its doors in these buildings.

== History ==
The origins go back to the year 1308, when Count Henry VII and his wife Margaret of Brabant decided to build a hospice for sick and poor citizens in the Grund district. They also built a church of the same name, the Church of Saint-Jean. Baldwin of Luxembourg, brother of Henry VII, Elector and Bishop of Trier, granted the church the rank of a parish church with all privileges.

The hospice was originally run by clergymen.

In 1547 the Benedictines of the Altmünster Abbey (founded in 1083 by Conrad I and destroyed in 1543) took over the hospice. They had to build a new hospital there, which was completed in 1550. It turned out that the new building was too small and not suitable for the purpose it was intended to serve. The fact that the hospital was used as a plague hospital in 1626 prevented other patients from being cared for there. In 1667 the hospital was completely dismantled and the title 'parish church' was taken away from the church in favour of the new Neumünster Abbey built next to it. The financial situation was so bad that the provincial council and the city of Luxembourg asked the inhabitants to donate. This action was a great success and in 1669 new buildings could be erected in the rue Münster. It was at this time that for the first time there was direct mention of doctors and nurses who worked in the hospital.

On 6 July 1672, nuns were officially entrusted with hospital care, on condition that they also provided outpatient medical care in the city.

During the conquest of the city by Louis XIV from France in 1684, the buildings were so badly damaged that the patients of the hospital had to be transferred to the Marché aux poissons and the Zorn House. After the hospital had become habitable again in 1689, the sick and wounded soldiers who had previously been cared for in the French military hospital in the Bonnevoie monastery initially found shelter there until the new military hospital in Pfaffenthal was completed.

In 1756 the hospital had 18 beds, which were cared for by 20 nuns.

During the French occupation (1795-1814) the hospice was used as an orphanage. It was also used as a prison for clergymen who refused to take the oath of office of the French revolutionary government, as a shelter for prostitutes and tramps and as an educational institution for girls.

On 30 July 1843, the patients of the hospice and the nursing staff, the sisters of the Order of Saint Elisabeth, were transferred to the buildings of the Holy Spirit Monastery in Pfaffenthal (Mohrfelsstrooss), a house that still exists today as a home for the elderly and nursing home.

In 1851 the hospice became a women's prison with a treatment station for sexually transmitted diseases. The sisters of the Franciscan Order were used as guards, they served there continuously from June 1, 1851 to July 15, 1978.

The women's prison in Grund existed until 12 May 1984, when the new prison in Schrassig was opened.

== Building ==
The building was declared a national monument on 15 January 1988.

=== Portal ===
The main entrance of the Natural History Museum at no. 25 in rue Münster consists of a monumental portal between two Corinthian columns. In the gable of the portal there are three coats of arms. The upper one is the coat of arms of Charles II of Spain, who reigned in Luxembourg in 1674 when the hospice was rebuilt. On the left is the coat of arms of the Duchy of Luxembourg with the red lion. On the right is the coat of arms of Philip de Croy, the then Governor of Luxembourg.

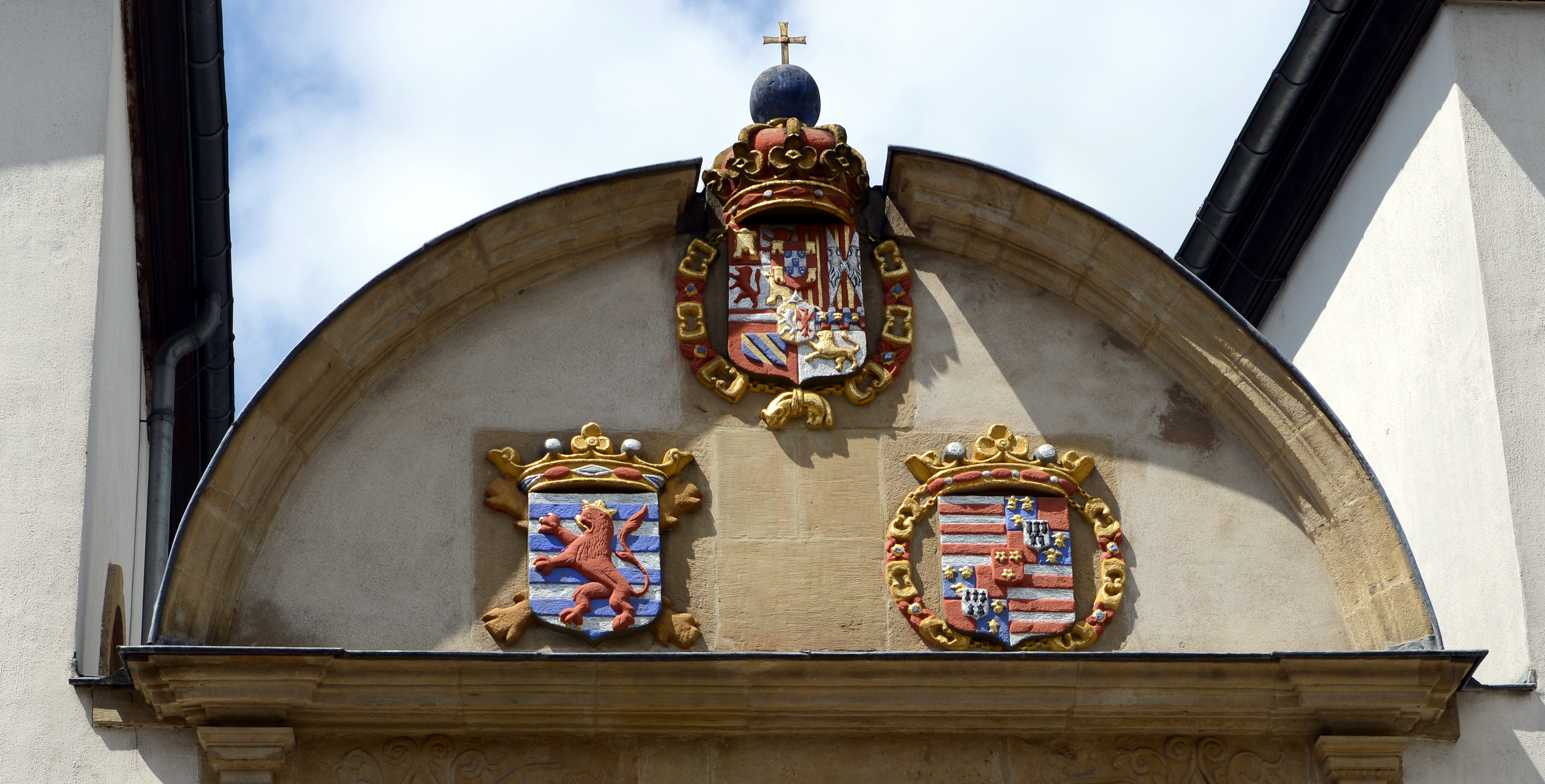
The coats of arms above the portal.

Below them is a text flanked by two statues: Mary on the left and John the Baptist on the right.

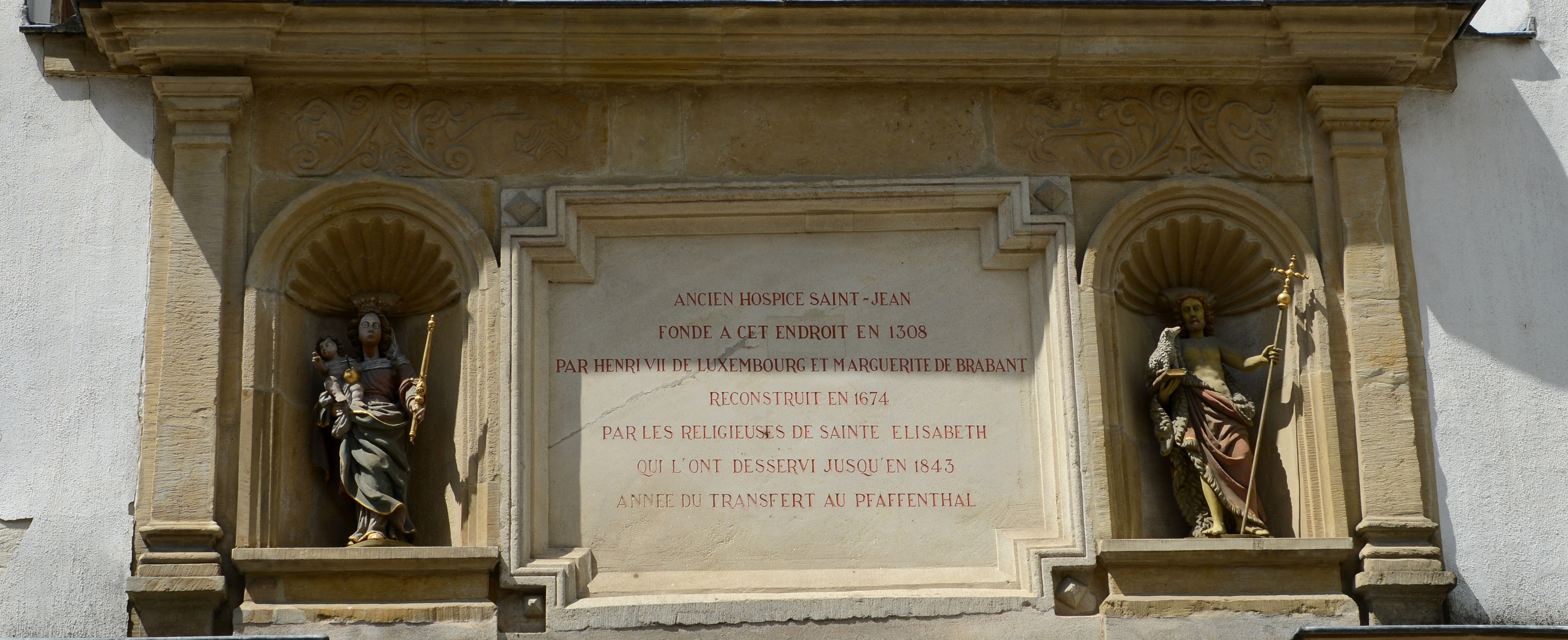
Inscription on the portal

ANCIEN HOSPICE SAINT-JEAN
FONDE A CET ENTDROIT EN 1308
PAR HENRI VII DE LUXEMBOURG ET MARGUERITE DE BRABANT
RECONSTRUIT EN 1674
PAR LES RELIGIEUSES DE SAINTE ELISABETH
QUI L'ONT DESSERVI JUSQU'EN 1843
ANNEE DU TRANSFERT AU PFAFFENTHAL

with the following translation into English:

FORMER HOSPICE SAINT-JEAN
FOUNDED IN THIS PLACE IN 1308
BY HENRY VII OF LUXEMBOURG AND MARGARETE OF BRABANT
REBUILT IN 1674
BY THE SISTERS OF SAINT ELIZABETH
WHO SERVED UNTIL 1843
THE YEAR OF THE RELOCATION TO PFAFFENTHAL

=== Niche with statue ===
Under a niche with a statue of Saint Sebastian to the left of the entrance is a chronogram with the year 1674:

100 + 50 + 1000 + 5 + 1 + 100 + 1 + 50 + 1 + 1 + 50 + 50 + 1 + 1 + 5 + 1 + 50 + 100 + 1 + 1 + 100 + 5 = 1674.

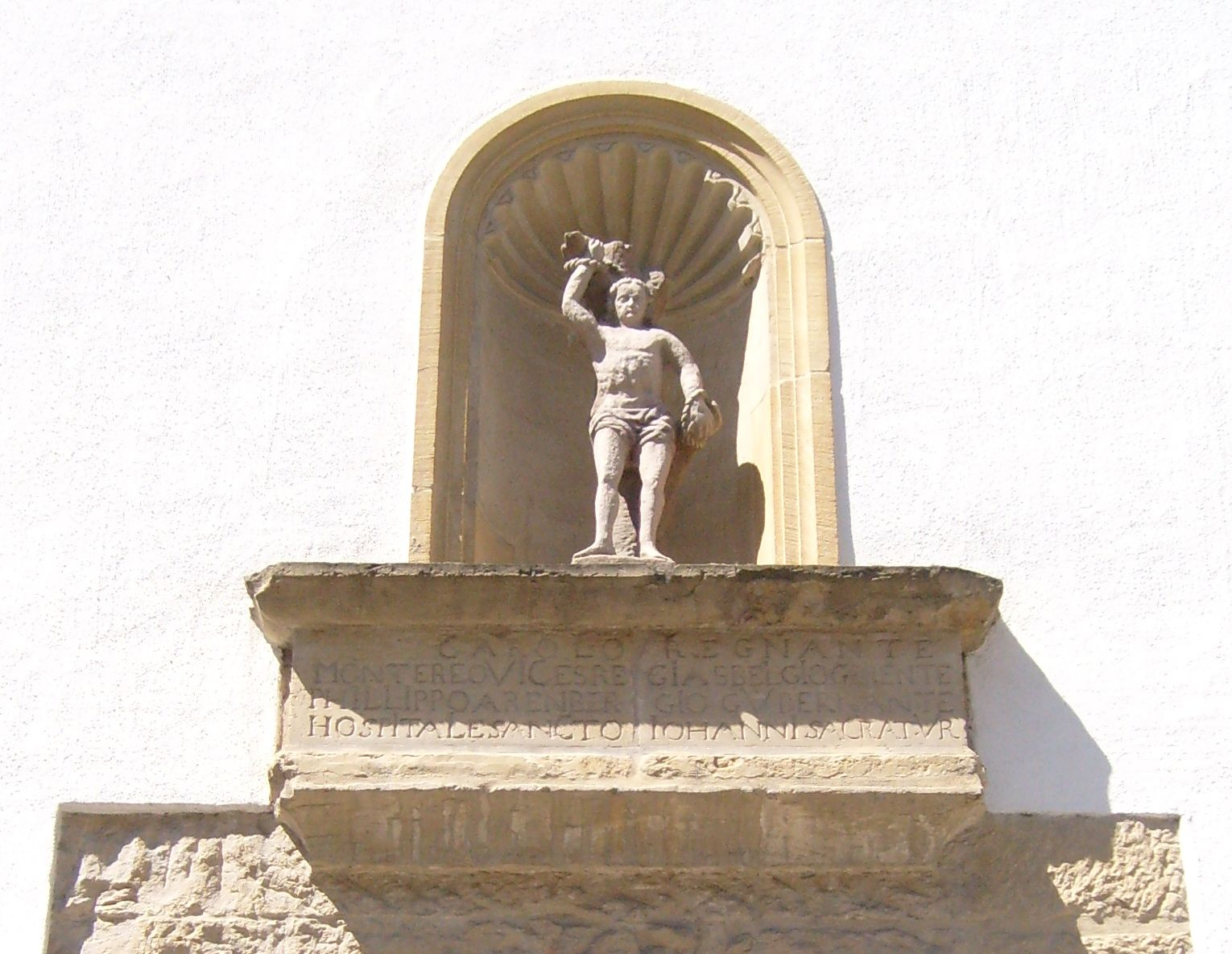
Niche to the left of the portal

CaroLo regnante
Montereo VICes regIas beLgIo gerente
phILLIppo ahrenbergIo gVbernante
hospItaLe sanCto IohannI saCratVr

with the following translation into English:

During the reign of [Emperor] Charles,
Monterrey rules Belgium,
Philippe d'Arenberg governs [Luxembourg],
This hospital is dedicated to Saint John.

== Bibliography ==
- Beck, H., 1995. L'Hospice St.-Jean au Grund. ons stad 50: 2–3.
- Kugener, H., Krankenpflege und Spitalwesen in Mittelalter und Neuzeit. ons stad 50: 4–9.
- Pauly, Michel, 2012. St. Elisabeth und St. Johann – Zwei Hospitäler in der mittelalterlichen Stadt Luxemburg. ons stad 100: 14–17. (Pdf)
- Pauly, M. & P. Bertemes (Koord.), 2009. De l'Hospice Saint-Jean à l'Hospice civil. 700 Jahre Hospitalgeschichte in der Stadt Luxemburg. Éditions mediArt, 116 S. ISBN 978-99959-635-1-4.
- Spielmann, A., 1995. La prison pour femmes – ou le tout carcéral. ons stad 50: 10–11.
- Schaus, Raymond, 2010. Au Stadgrond autrefois : Les racines de la ville de Luxembourg - Un survol historique. Die Warte 14/2292: 5 (29. April 2010).
