= Michel Rodange =

Luxembourgish writer and poet

- Born: 3 January 1827; Waldbillig, Luxembourg
- Died: 27 August 1876 (aged 49)
- Occupations: Schoolteacher, poet, novelist
- Writing career
- Notable work: Renert oder de Fuuß am Frack an a Ma'nsgrëßt

Michel Rodange (3 January 1827 – 27 August 1876) was a Luxembourgish writer and poet, best known for writing Luxembourg's national epic, Reynard|Renert [full original title: Renert oder de Fuuß am Frack an a Ma'nsgrëßt].

== Biography ==
Rodange was born in Waldbillig. He was a schoolteacher by profession, teaching in Steinsel and Larochette, although he later became a city worker in Echternach.

His most notable work was Renert, published in 1872. An epic satirical work—adapted from the 1858 Cotta Edition of Goethe's fox epic Reineke Fuchs to a setting in Luxembourg— it is known for its insightful analysis of the unique characteristics of the people of Luxembourg, using regional and sub regional dialects to depict the fox and his companions.

The Lycée Michel-Rodange school in Luxembourg City is named after him. He has been featured on two postage stamps.
