= Little Switzerland (Luxembourg) =

Region of Luxembourg

Coordinates: 49.7°N 6.5°E

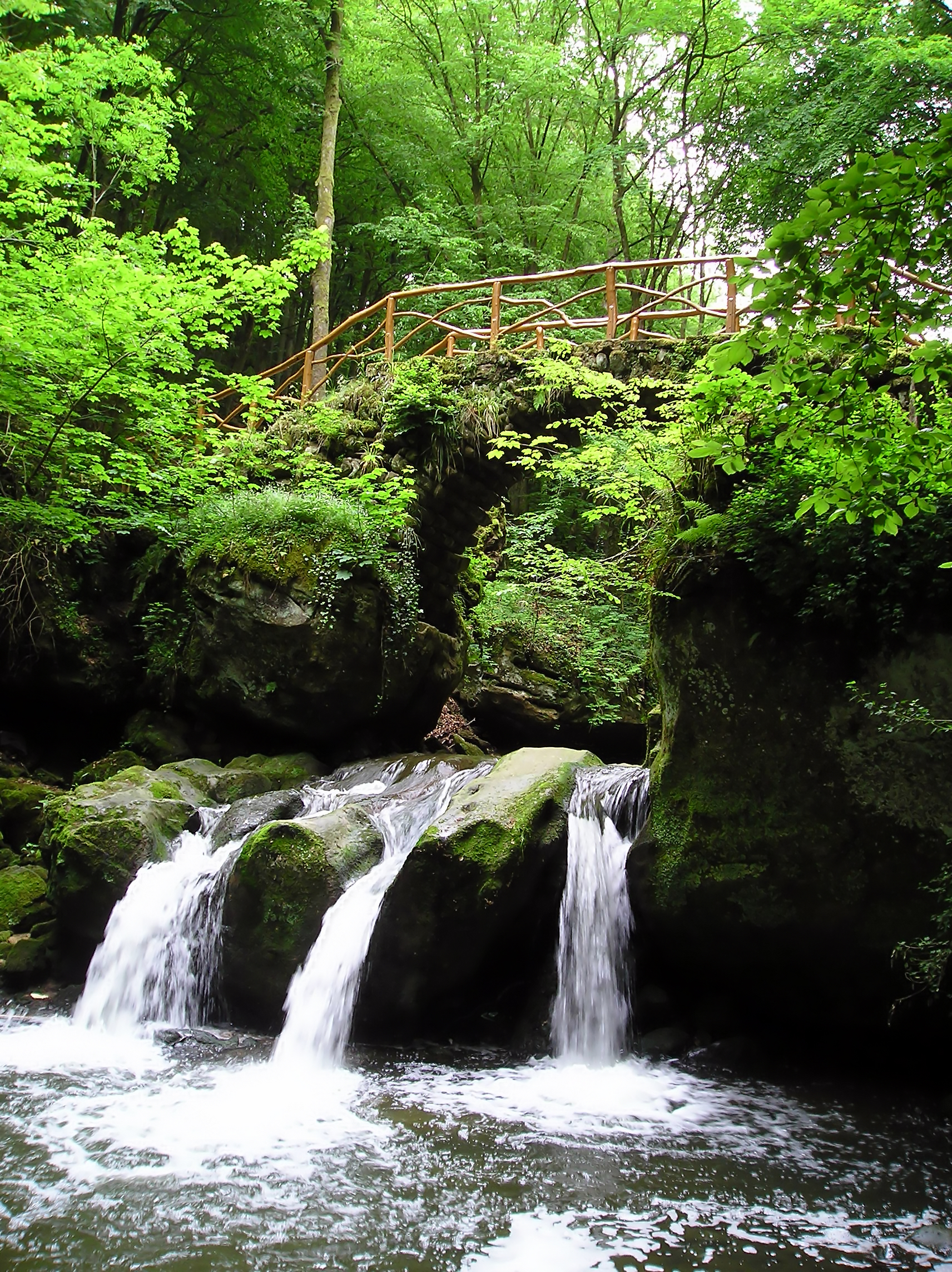
Schéissendëmpel waterfall

Little Switzerland (French: Petite Suisse Luxembourgeoise [pətit sɥis lyksɑ̃buʁʒwaz]; Luxembourgish: Kleng Lëtzebuerger Schwäiz; German: Kleine Luxemburger Schweiz [ˈklaɪnə ˈlʊksm̩bʊʁɡɐ ˈʃvaɪts]) is a nickname for a region in the east of Luxembourg, bestowed upon the region on account of its reputed geographical similarities to Switzerland. It is roughly contiguous with the canton of Echternach. It is also known as the Mullerthal (Luxembourgish: Mëllerdall, German: Müllertal) after the town of Mullerthal.

Little Switzerland is thought to have similar terrain to its namesake country, hence the name; it is dominated by craggy terrain, thick forests, some caves and myriad small streams. Unlike Switzerland, Little Switzerland is low-lying, even by Luxembourg standards (its highest peak is only 414 m above sea level).

Little Switzerland is the smallest of Luxembourg's sub-regions. Within its territory, covering only 7% of Luxembourg, there is only one medium-sized settlement, Echternach (which is Luxembourg's oldest surviving city). Smaller towns include Beaufort, Berdorf and Consdorf.
