= Genetic history of Sardinia =

The genetic history of Sardinia consists of the study of the gene pool of the Sardinian people with two main objectives. The first is purely cultural and is to reconstruct the natural history of the population. The other instead has the aim of understanding the genetic causes of high life expectancy and of some pathologies by exploiting some peculiarities of the Sardinian population.

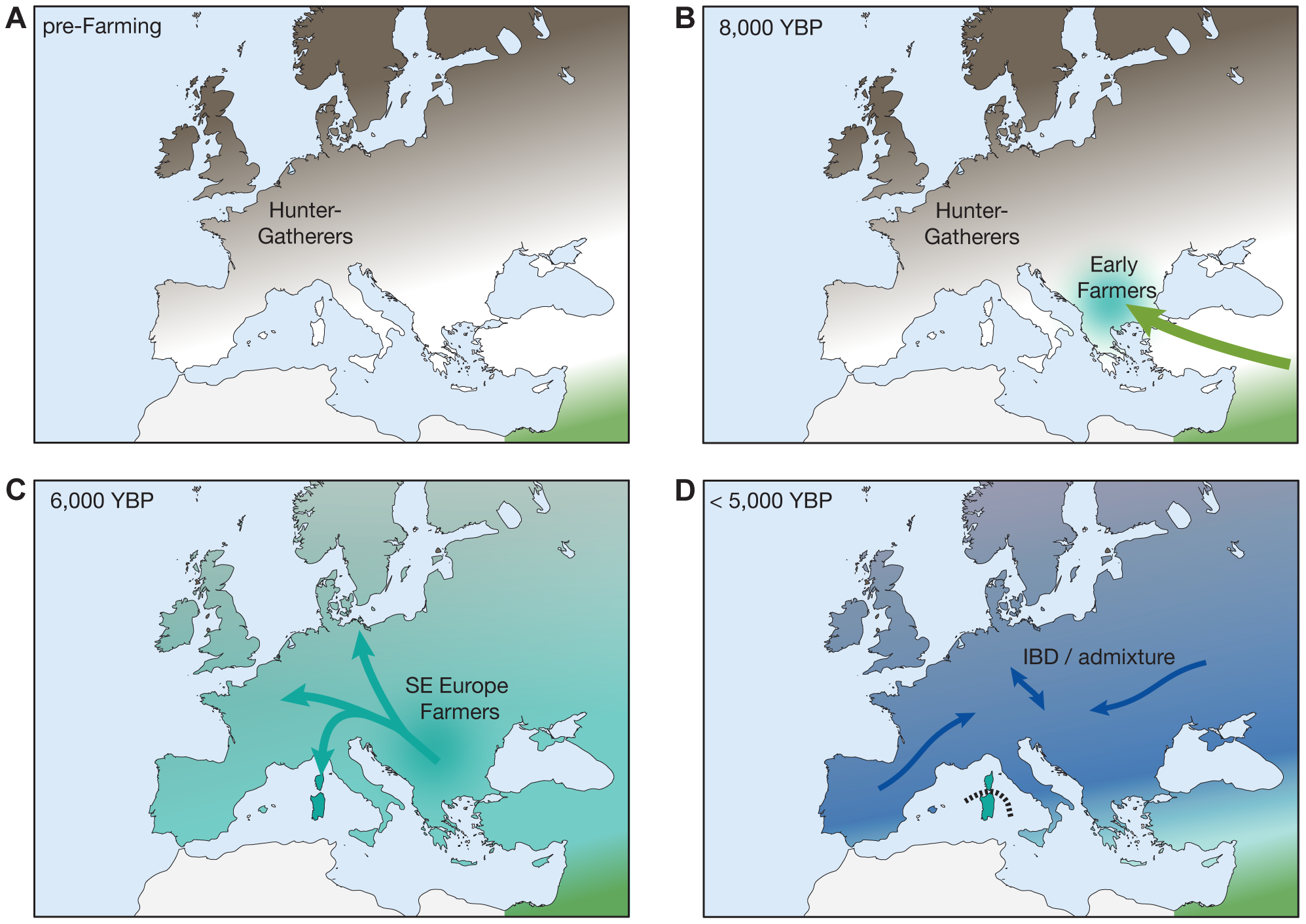
A simplified model for recent demographic history of Europeans. The panels indicate a possible demographic scenario consistent with the observed signals. (A) Mesolithic HGs present in mainland Europe prior to the arrival of agriculture. (B) Initial spread of farming from the Middle East beginning from 7,000 YBP into SE Europe. (C) Expansion of farming to N Europe from SE European gene pool and establishment of main S-N gradient of genetic diversity. Wave of migration also reaches Sardinia. (D) Continuous population expansion and admixture with local HGs as well as additional migrations continues to shape genetic diversity in mainland Europe, but Sardinia remains mostly isolated (IBD: isolation by distance). Subsequent studies based on ancient DNA from Sardinia have found that Sardinians are less isolated than previously thought

The geographical position of Sardinia and the mountainousness of its territory have meant that particular anthropological and genetic characteristics have been created in the Sardinian population, due to phenomena such as isolation, endogamy and evolutionary processes such as genetic drift, in similarly to other European populations such as the Basques, Sámi and Icelanders.

The high genetic variability implies a significant number of founding lines. Archeology indicates that the actual size of the Sardinian population was significant compared to other contemporary geographical areas such as Corsica. Great demographic crises, such as those caused by plague epidemics, have not been able to affect the original structure of the population.

== Studies ==
=== Autosomal studies ===
Recent comparisons between the Sardinians' genome and that of some individuals from the Neolithic and the early Chalcolithic, who lived in the Alpine, German, and Hungarian regions, showed considerable similarities between these populations and current day Sardinians, while at the same time showing consistent differences with the present inhabitants of those geographical areas. By autosomal DNA, Ötzi, Europe's oldest known human natural mummy of a man who lived between 3350 and 3105 BC in the Alps on the Austria–Italy border, is most closely related to the current inhabitants of Sardinia.

From this it can be deduced that, while central and northern Europe have undergone significant demographic changes due to post-Neolithic migrations, presumably from the eastern periphery of Europe (Pontic–Caspian steppe), Southern Europe and Sardinia in particular were affected less; Sardinians appear to be the population that has best preserved the Neolithic legacy of Western Europe.

A 2020 study by Fernandes et al. estimated that the current Sardinian genome derives roughly 62.5% from Anatolian Neolithic Farmers (ANF), 9.7% from the Mesolithic Western Hunter-Gatherers (WHG), 13.9% from ancestry related to Neolithic Iranians of Ganj Dareh (or also Caucasus-related ancestry), 10.6% from the Bronze Age Western Steppe Herders (WSH) of the Yamnaya culture and, lastly, 3.4% from Late Neolithic Moroccans (partly of European origin). Fernandes concluded that: "Major immigration into Sardinia began in the first millennium BC and, at present, no more than 56–62% of Sardinian ancestry is from its first farmers. This value is lower than previous estimates, highlighting that Sardinia, similar to every other region in Europe, has been a stage for major movement and mixtures of people".

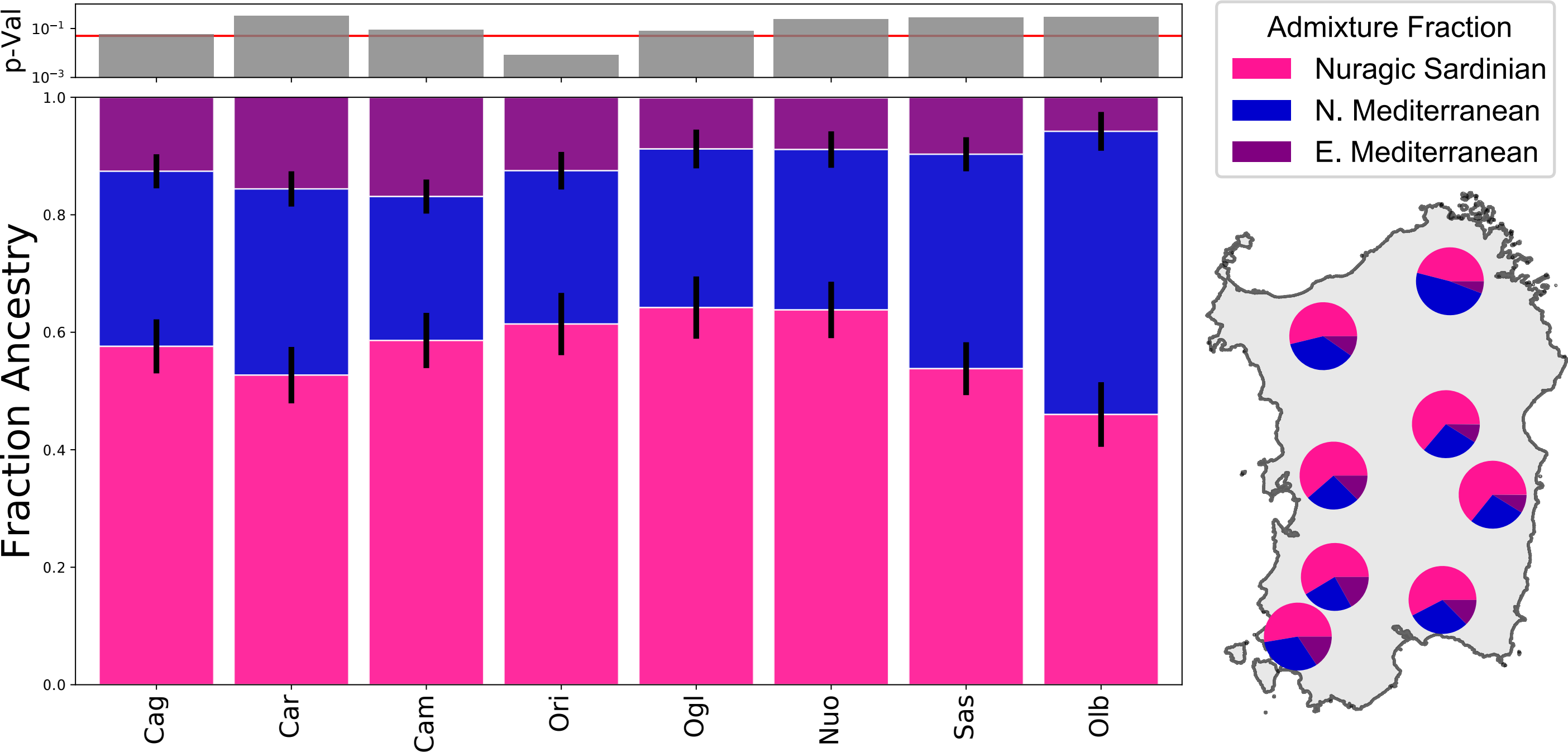
Three-way admixture model of present-day Sardinians by pre-2016 province.

Another study from 2020 by Marcus et al. also found that the present-day Sardinian genome was shaped by immigration from the Iron Age onwards, which can be modelled well using three source populations, namely "Nuragic Sardinia, one northern Mediterranean source (e.g., individuals with group labels Lombardy, Tuscan, French, Basque, Spanish) and one eastern Mediterranean source (e.g., individuals with group labels Turkish-Jew, Libyan-Jew, Maltese, Tunisian-Jew, Moroccan-Jew, Lebanese, Druze, Cypriot, Jordanian, Palestinian)". Moreover, using a three-way model with Nuragic Sardinians, as well as "potential sources from various ancient samples that are representative of different regions of the Mediterranean", it was determined that "models with the largest p-values return fractions of Nuragic ancestry that are close to, or higher than 50%". North African ancestry among present-day Sardinians was found to be "negligible".

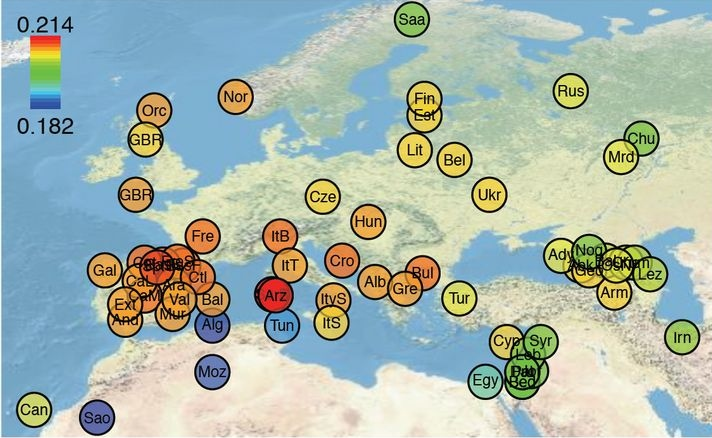
Outgroup f3 statistics of the form f3 (San; Stuttgart, X), where X is a population across the merged dataset of Sardinia and Human Origins Array data. Higher f3 values suggest larger shared drift between a pair of populations

Raveane et al 2022, analysing the genetic structure of present-day Greek, and Italian populations, confirmed the Sardinians' status as an outlier in the Italian gene pool, stating that "Modern Italians, with the exception of Sardinians, are very different from the Mesolithic, Neolithic and Bronze Age individuals from the same area, with some resemblance only in Iron Age samples." In a four-way modelling with Anatolian Neolithic Farmers (Anatolia_N), Western European Hunter-Gatherers (WHG), Neolithic samples from the Iranian Plateau (Iran_N), and Eastern European Hunter-Gatherers (EHG), Sardinians stood out by having notably more Anatolia_N-related ancestry, ~ 71% to be precise. Additionally, they were found to have ~ 18% Iran_N-related ancestry, whereas the remaining populations examined all had ~ 29 to 36% of this component. A different modelling using Neolithic Europeans (Europe_EN), Western Steppe Herders (Steppe_EMBA), and Iran_N saw "a sharp decrease in Iran_N contribution (from ~ 10 to 26%), due to the fact that a substantial proportion of Iran Neolithic-like ancestry might have arrived in the continent with Steppe Pastoralists" - a development Sardinians were seemingly less affected by than their neighbours. Additionally, Sardinians, along with samples from Lombardy, and Tuscany, were found to need the addition of WHG as a fourth source, indicating an excess of WHG with respect of Europe_EN.

Sardinians as a whole are not simply a homogeneous genetic population: several studies have found some differences among the various villages and sub-regions of the island. In this regard, the mountainous area of Ogliastra (part of the wider region of Barbagia) is more distant from the rest of Europe and the Mediterranean than other Sardinian sub-regions located in the plains and in the coastal areas. This occurs in part because these more accessible areas show the highest genetic influxes of Bronze Age steppe, Iranian farmer-related and North African ancestries in Sardinia, although still moderate in comparison to the predominant Neolithic farmer ancestry. By contrast, the more isolated area of Ogliastra retains the highest amount of earlier Mesolithic and Neolithic ancestry on the island.

According to a study released in 2014, the genetic diversity among some Sardinian individuals from different regions of the island is between 7 and 30 times higher than the one found among other European ethnicities living thousands kilometers away from each other, like Spaniards and Romanians. A similar phenomenon is commonly found in other isolated populations, like the Ladin groups from the Italian region of Veneto and in the Alpine area, where the local orography did not facilitate intraregional communications. However, despite a high degree of interindividual genetic differentiation being detected on multiple occasions, other studies have also stated that such variability does not occur among the main macro-regions of the island: a Sardinian region like the Barbagia has been proven not to be significantly different from the regions on the coast, like the area of Cagliari and Oristano. A study by Contu et al. (2008) found a relatively high degree of genetic homogeneity between Sardinian individuals from three different regions of the island: the northernmost area (Tempio, Gallura), a central zone (Sorgono, Barbagia of Mandrolisai) and the southernmost area (Cagliari, Campidano). Other studies have suggested again a certain degree of homogeneity within the Sardinian population.

The 2015 SardiNIA study showed, by using the F_{ST} differentiation statistic, a clear genetic differentiation between Sardinians (whole genome sequence of 2120 individuals from across the island and especially the Lanusei valley) and populations from the Italian peninsula (1000 genomes), and reported an even more significant amount of difference between the Sardinians from the above-mentioned Lanusei valley (in the mountainous Barbagia region) and the other European populations. This pattern of differentiation is also evident in the lengths for haplotypes surrounding rare variants loci, with a similar haplotype length for Sardinian populations and shorter length for populations with low grade of common ancestry.

=== Y-DNA and mtDNA studies ===
Distribution of Haplogroup I

The most common Y-DNA haplogroups among the Sardinian males, comprising ~70% of the population, are, in descending order, I2 (particularly I2a1a-M26), R1b-M269 and G2a. They are found respectively in the Western Hunter-Gatherers, Western Steppe Herders, and Early European Farmers.

As in the rest of Europe, the most common mitochondrial DNA haplogroup is H, especially H1 and H3, both possibly present in the Western Mediterranean since the Mesolithic.

=== Conclusions ===
In conclusion, it can therefore be stated that the Sardinian genes fit within the European gene pool, in particular Western Europe, with major differences however in terms of:

- gene frequencies (mostly due to founder effect and random genetic drift). For example, the I2a1(M26) haplotype of the Y chromosome, also present in the Iberian Peninsula and in France (19% in Castile, 8% in Béarn and 6% among the Basques) has frequencies of up to over 40% in Sardinia. The high frequency of this haplotype among Sardinians would be due to a prehistoric migration of peoples originating from continental Europe towards Sardinia, perhaps from the Pyrenees region or, alternatively, from Tuscany, through the Elba island and Corsica. Haplogroup I, present in Europe since the Upper Paleolithic, is found among modern Europeans mainly in the Sardinian population, but in similar percentages also among those of the Western Balkans and Scandinavia.
- presence of Sardinian-specific haplotype (attributable to mutations that occurred on the island given the long time that has passed from the foundation to today). For example, the R-M18 haplotype is exclusive to Sardinia and originates from the acquisition of a mutation from the more ancient R-M173 haplogroup; there is also the mitochondrial line U5b3a1a, almost exclusive to Sardinia but originating from Provence.

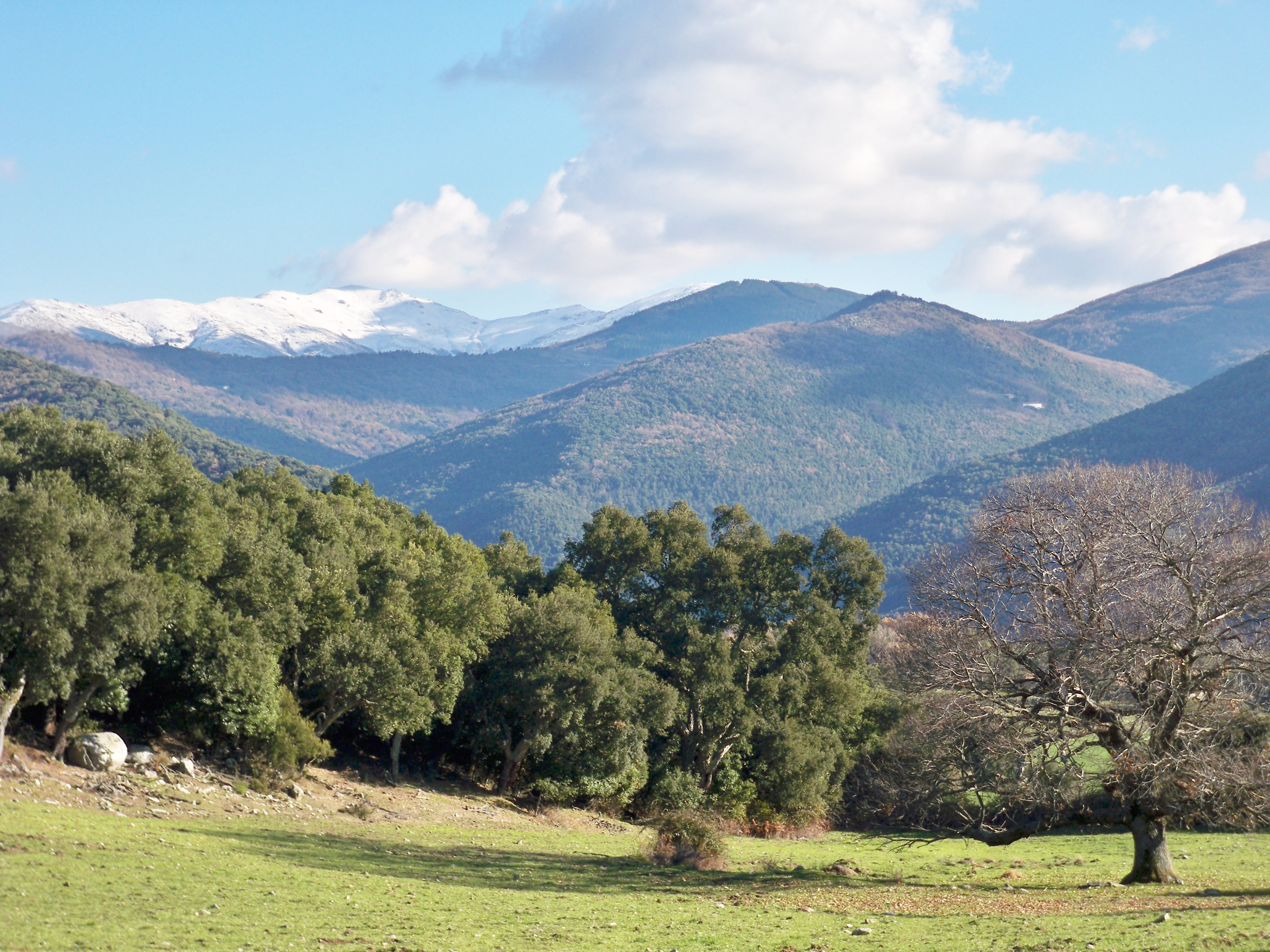
Gennargentu mountains. Sardinians from the Gennargentu area have a higher level of Early European Farmer and Western Hunter-Gatherer ancestries compared to the rest of the island

- low incidence of the ANE (Ancient North Eurasian) autosomal component, widespread in most Eurasian populations and among Native Americans; constitutes approximately 10-20% of the genetic ancestry of current Europeans, in Sardinia approximately 5%. This component, which can be linked to some Siberian Paleolithic populations including those of the Mal'ta-Buret' culture, would have arrived in Western Europe from the East starting from the Chalcolithic period through the migration of new populations called Western Steppe Herders. The genetic contribution of the peoples of the Pontic-Caspian steppes, who are believed to have introduced the Indo-European languages to Europe, is more relevant in Sardinia in the coastal and sub-coastal regions than in the mountainous region of Gennargentu.

== Common genetic diseases ==
Common genetic diseases among the Sardinian population include:

- Type 1 diabetes
- Wilson's disease
- Multiple sclerosis
- Thalassemia
- Autoimmune polyendocrine syndrome type 1

== Longevity ==
The "AKeA" project (acronym for "A Kent'Annos", a traditional Sardinian wish meaning "may you live to be 100 years old"), based on studies carried out since 1997 by Prof. Luca Deiana's team and officially presented in February 2002, it is headed by the chair of Clinical Biochemistry at the University of Sassari and sees the collaboration of the Max Planck Institute for Demographic Research in Rostock, Germany and the Duke University of North Carolina, in the US. Monitoring is done on the entire Sardinian population.

The results of the "AKeA" study were published and presented in various international symposiums which saw the participation of researchers from all over the world, who came to the island to study the DNA of Sardinians, and also aroused the interest of mass media.

In Sardinia the presence of numerous centenarians has long been noted; a study by Robert J. Rowland about 390 funerary inscriptions from Roman Sardinia, detected the presence of at least three centenarians. In July 2007 there were more than 330. On average there are around 22 centenarians per 100.000 inhabitants, compared to an average of between 8 and 10 in other parts of the world. This ratio appears to be growing over time, since in the period 1998-99 the average was 13.5 over centenarians, and in 2000 it had risen to 19.

Internal areas with a high concentration of long-lived people have been identified, and it has been discovered that the male/female ratio over one hundred years old in Sardinia is very different from that present elsewhere. If in the rest of Italy and in the West the ratio is 1 to 4, if not even 1 to 7, on the island it is generally below 1 to 2, becoming equal in the internal areas.

Many explanations have been formulated for this particularity, such as quality of life or a particular diet, but mainly scholars are interested in analyzing specific genetic factors that interact in conjunction with environmental factors.

The island boasts some records:

- the oldest man in the world, certified by the Guinness Book of Records 2001. Antonio Todde (called Tziu Antoni), born in Tiana (NU) on 22 January 1889, died on 3 January 2002, a few weeks before his 113th birthday; he attributed his longevity to the glass of good red wine he drank every day.
- the oldest man in Europe, and third in the world, in 2003. Giovanni Frau, born in Orroli (CA) on 29 December 1890, died on 19 June 2003 at the age of 112.

== See also ==
- History of Sardinia
- Genetic history of Italy
- Genetic history of Europe
