= Mullerthal, Luxembourg =

Village in Luxembourg

Coordinates: 49°47′N 6°19′E

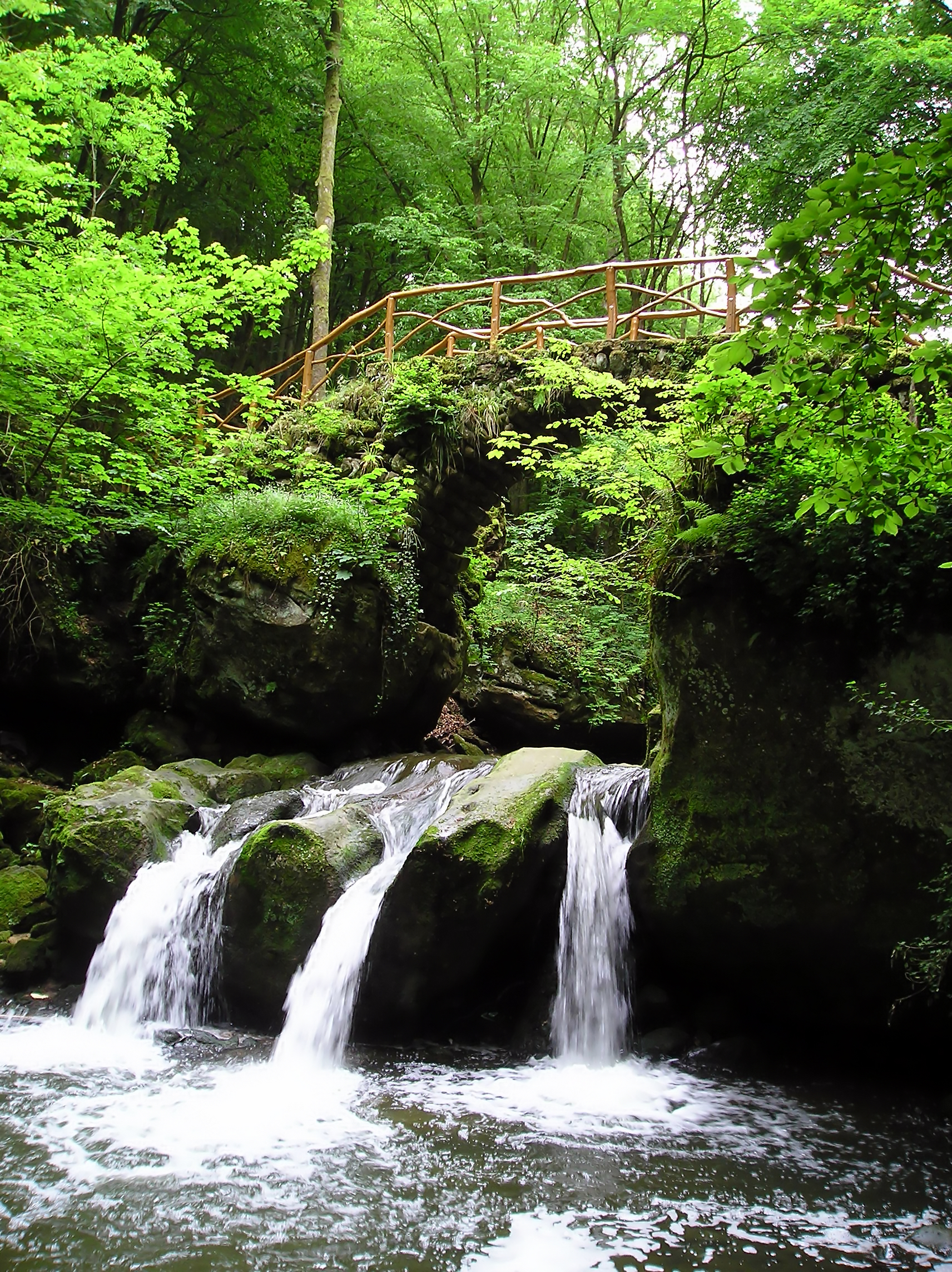
The Schéissendëmpel waterfall

Mullerthal (Luxembourgish: Mëllerdall; German: Müllertal [ˈmʏlɐtaːl]) is a village in the commune of Waldbillig, in eastern Luxembourg. As of September 2026, the village had a population of 50. It lends its name to the alternative name of a region of eastern Luxembourg, otherwise known as Little Switzerland.
