= Waldbillig =

Waldbillig Waldbëlleg (Luxembourgish)
- Commune
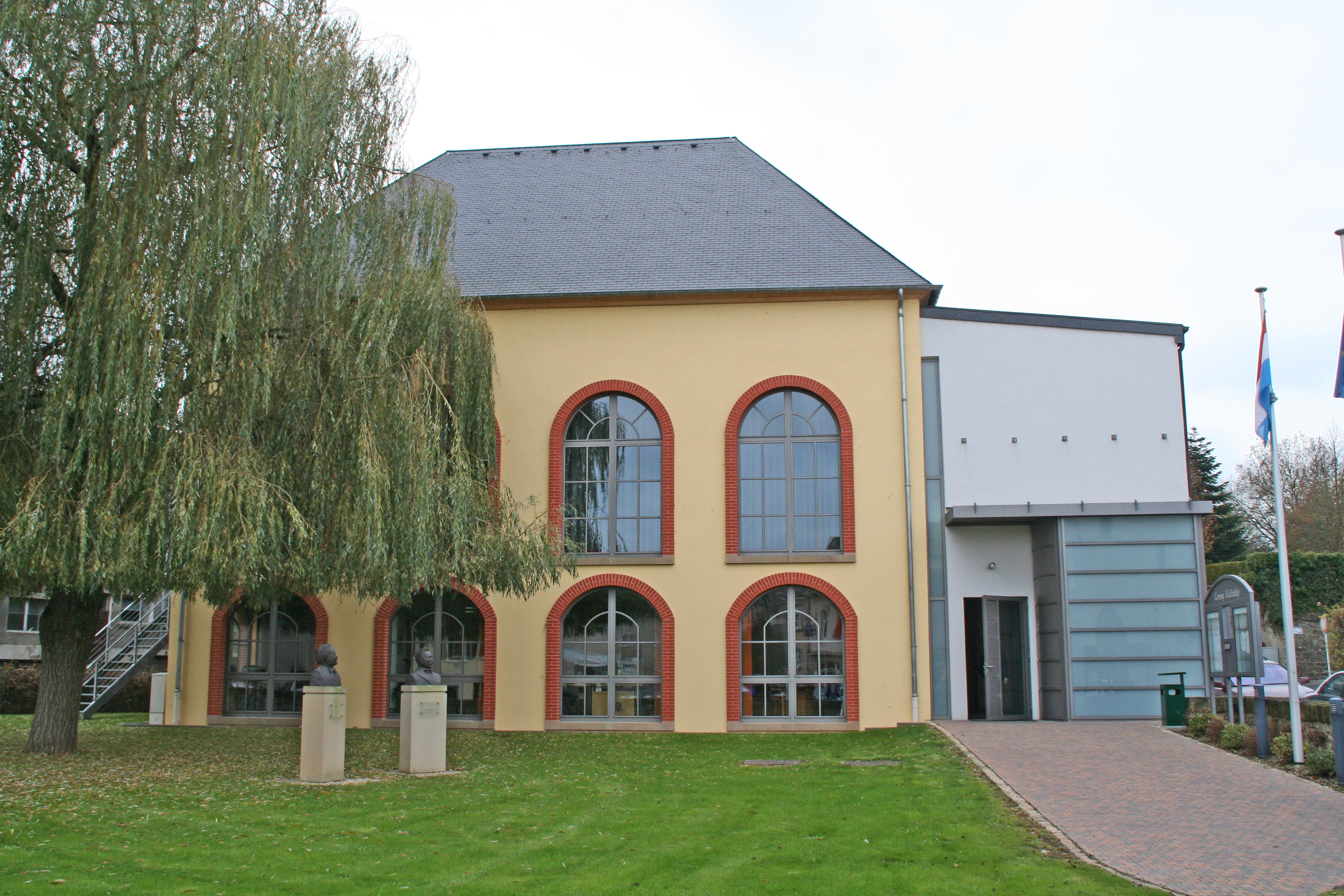
- Town hall

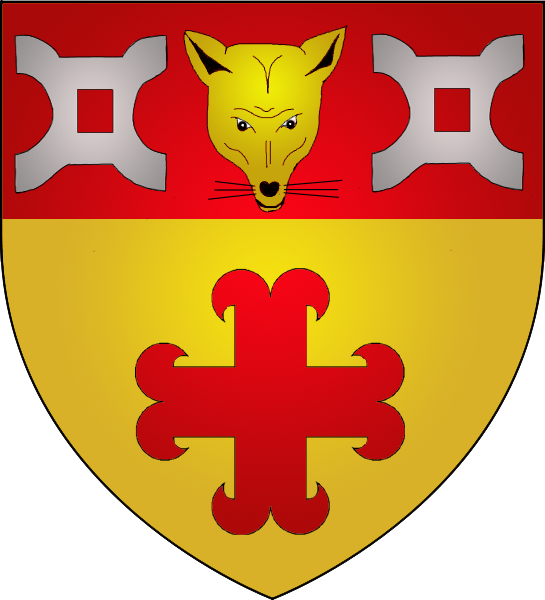
- Coat of arms

- Map of Luxembourg with Waldbillig highlighted in orange, and the canton in dark red
- Coordinates: 49.7958°N 6.2861°E
- Country: Luxembourg
- Canton: Echternach

Government
  - Mayor: Andrée Henx-Greischer

Area
  - Total: 23.28 km^{2} (8.99 sq mi)
  - Rank: 40th of 100
- Highest elevation: 387 m (1,270 ft)
  - Rank: 63rd of 100
- Lowest elevation: 186 m (610 ft)
  - Rank: 18th of 100

Population (2026)
  - Total: 1,996
  - Rank: 84th of 100
  - Density: 85.74/km^{2} (222.1/sq mi)
  - Rank: 74th of 100
- Time zone: UTC+1 (CET)
  - Summer (DST): UTC+2 (CEST)
- LAU 2: LU0001008
- Website: waldbillig.lu

Waldbillig (German pronunciation: [valtˈbɪlɪç]; Luxembourgish: Waldbëlleg [vɑltˈbələɕ] or locally Bëlleg) is a commune and small town in the canton of Echternach, Luxembourg.

As of September 2026, the town of Waldbillig, which lies in the centre of the commune, has a population of 628.

== Populated places ==
The commune consists of the following villages, alongside their population:

- Christnach (Chrëschtnech; population: 822)
- Freckeisen (Freckeisen; population: 24)
- Haller (Haler; population: 427)
- Mullerthal (Mëllerdall; population: 62)
- Niesenthal (Nisendaller Haff; population: ?)
- Waldbillig (Waldbëlleg; population: 599)
- Fléckenhaff (lieu-dit)
- Grondhaff-Schlass (lieu-dit)
- Haarthaff (lieu-dit)
- Kelleschhaff (lieu-dit)
- Savelborn (Note: Part of the farm belongs to the section of Medernach of the commune of Vallée de l'Ernz.) (Suewelbuer) (lieu-dit)
- Uelegsmillen (lieu-dit)

== Population ==
Historical population

Year	Pop.	±%
1821	1,105	—
1851	1,506	+36.3%
1900	1,140	−24.3%
1910	1,185	+3.9%
1922	1,097	−7.4%
1935	994	−9.4%

Year	Pop.	±%
1947	895	−10.0%
1960	780	−12.8%
1970	729	−6.5%
1981	684	−6.2%
1990	776	+13.5%
2000	1,025	+32.1%

Year	Pop.	±%
2005	1,302	+27.0%
2010	1,478	+13.5%
2015	1,554	+5.1%
2020	1,832	+17.9%
2021	1,902	+3.8%

Source data
