= Butovo culture =

Mesolithic culture in modern day Russia

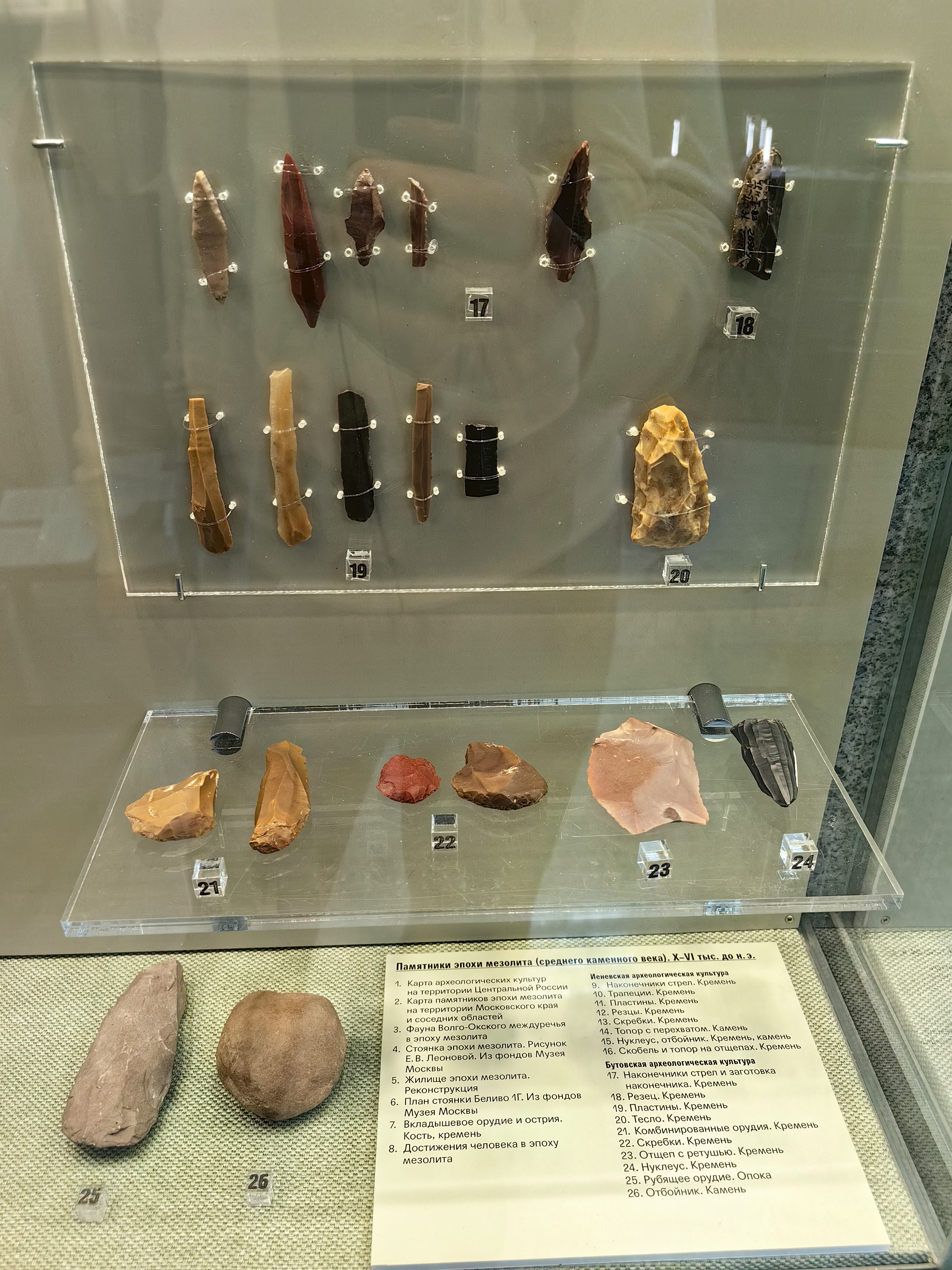
- Period: Mesolithic
- Dates: c. 9600 BC – 6000 BC
- Preceded by: Swiderian culture
- Followed by: Upper Volga culture

The Butovo culture (Russian: Бутовская культура) was a post-glacial Mesolithic culture in the Upper Volga region of Russia in the catchment areas of the Volga and Oka rivers, 9600-6000 BC. The culture was formed by groups that developed from the Swiderian culture, which migrated to the region from the south as the climate warmed after the Ice Age. The Butovo culture is divided into the Early (9600-9100 BC), Middle (9100-7300 BC) and Late (7300-6000 BC) phases. It has also been suggested that the Butovo culture began in the Younger Dryas period before 10100 BC.

In the Upper Volga, groups of Ienevo and Resseta cultures also lived side by side with the Butovo population. Their relationship is as yet unclear, but they may have merged with the Butovo over time, since by the Neolithic period the region was influenced by a more coherent Upper Volga group.

== Known places of residence ==
Butovo culture sites are generally located on dry and sandy sites. Their finds are absent of organic material. Such sites include Butovo-1 (Бyтовo-1), Prislon-1 (Прислон-1) and Listvenka-3a (Лиcтвeнкa-3a). Some of the sites were former lake shores that were flooded or swamped, preserving all organic material. The most famous swamps are Dubna in the Moscow Oblast, Ivanovskoje and Berendeevo in the Yaroslavl Oblast, Sahtyš and Podozerskoje in the Ivanovo Oblast and Ozerki in the Tver Oblast.

=== Ozerki ===
The Ozerki swamp is located 20 km from Tver, near the Shosha River, which flows into the Volga. In the preboreal period, the area was still a lake system, with water levels rising and falling several times over thousands of years. As a result, people moved their place of residence numerous times. After the start of peat production, about 20 Mesolithic or Neolithic sites were found. These were excavated between 1990 and 1991.

Site Ozerki-14 is from the early Butovo cultural period and the pre-Boreal natural period. It had not yet been studied in 1994. Sites Ozerki-16, -17 and -9 are from the Middle Butovo cultural period. They have been the subject of a large number of wood, bone, horn and hide finds.

An area of 12 m² was investigated at site Ozerki-16, revealing, among other things, the remains of a pine-wooden slat, an oval-shaped arched bell, the lower part of a sharpened pile driven into the ground, an arrowhead with resin still in the reed, a net weight with a remaining binding needle and Shigir-type arrows. The worked wood strand was dated to 7 800 BC.

The site Ozerki-17 was surveyed on 41 m². Its oldest deposit contained much the same artifacts as Ozerki-16, including many points of sharpened stakes driven into the ground, many willow leaf-shaped silicon arrowheads, as well as older triangular (tanged point) points, one diagonal arrowhead and a fishing hook with a line. The oldest Mesolithic layer at the site was dated to 8 000 BC.

Three human bones were found in the layers of the habitation site, but they did not belong to the occupants of the site. Their radiocarbon dating takes the bones back to about 1500 years to 6 500 BC, when the Ozerki-17 site was covered by water. The nearest settlement of the age of the bones was found half a kilometer away. The bones were rich in iron, arsenic and zinc, which, together with a low fish consumption, suggests a high intake of mushrooms.

The most productive excavation area was found at the Ozerki-5 site, where 94 m² of swamp was examined. It starts at the end of the Middle Butovo period and ends in two distinct periods. The period of the dated artefacts ranges from 7400-5900 BP, or 6200-4800 BC.

In the oldest find layer of the Ozerki-5 habitation from the Middle Butovo period, about 500 stone tool finds and more than 500 bone or horn finds were made. In addition to flint working debris, other finds included scrapers (the largest number), picks, oblique and symmetrical arrowheads (more than 50), knives, drills, polished axes, grinding stones and pitchforks. There were also various types of arrowheads made of bone and horn: needle-shaped, flat-headed, blunt and Shigir-shaped, as well as saw-edged spearheads and harpoon heads. Tools identified included daggers, knives, scrapers, scrapers, snuffers and beaver teeth. Pendants with fox or boar teeth were also observed, and some bones were decorated with patterns.

Mostly elk and beaver were hunted for food. Bones of other animals were also found: red deer, roe deer, wild boar, wild boar, badger, rabbit, weasel, otter, wolf, fox and wood mouse. Fish and bird bones were very abundant.

=== Podozerskoye ===
The Stanovoje-4 settlement site was excavated between 1993 and 2002 on an area of 600 m² of riverbank. It was located in the bone estuary of an ancient lake (5×3 km²) of the Lahost River in the Podozerskoye marshland. The settlement was flooded from time to time, but was always reoccupied. Eventually the site was covered by a layer of silts one metre thick and eventually became marshy. The finds cover the early and middle Butovo periods. Currently, Stanovoje-4 is the earliest known Butovo culture site.

The two excavations yielded the oldest Butovo artefacts, dated to the very young post-Dryasic heat wave of 9 000-8 300 BC which marks the beginning of the pre-Boreal period. The finds consisted of 154 lithic objects, 54 bone or horn objects and bone debris (see photos by Hartz, S. et al.). The stones were of poor quality silica and there were only a few objects with material imported from further afield. From the material found, it was noted that even at that time the Butovo culture produced regular and long slats as raw material for tools, and that they were made using a pressing technique.

Axes and chisels were made of bone and weak stone material. The axes were implanted in the wood with bone or horn stakes, which were made by drilling. Composite knives were found alongside the bone knives, with silicon flakes glued into a groove in the body of the knife. The same technique was used to enhance the effect of the spear or harpoon point. Arrowheads were made by shaping bone or horn. The so-called shigir points were made by turning them into rounds. Most of the tools were scrapers or drills.

Human bones were found at the site with a radiocarbon date of about 8 500 BC, the same as the other dates of the site. The bones are thought to have belonged to a resident of the site who was buried at the same site.

The source of the animal material was moose and beaver, but there were also bones of bear, badger, rabbit, weasel, otter, small rodents and dog, among others. The fauna remained almost unchanged during the Mesolithic period.

The camp had to be abandoned afterwards and, after the flood had subsided, remains of the Ieneva culture were discovered in the third layer, covering a period of about 100 years from 9600 to 9500 BC[2]. When the next lake level rise expelled people from the site, the Butonovo culture returned to the second layer of finds after the lakes had subsided sufficiently. This layer is dated to 8 500-7 550 BC, which means the Boreal period.

The finds of stone tools consisted mostly of scrapers, picks and axes. Arrowheads were made in two different ways. They were made from regular slats or irregular slats by shaping straight (tanged point) or leaf-shaped arrowheads. Axes ground from slate were common.

Arrowheads were mostly of the Shigir type. Composite points of the early Butovo phase, made by gluing silicon inclusions into a longitudinal groove, still existed. Among the fishing gear, fish hooks were found.

The youngest layer of site Stavonoja-4 still contains remnants of the Upper Volga Neolithic culture.

=== Sahtyš ===
The settlement Sahtyš-14 is located in a swamp about 45 km southwest of Ivanovo. The site, located on the bank of the Koika River, has 4 cultural layers: the Early Butovo (8950-8500 BC), the Middle Butovo (8300-7900 BC), the Late Butovo phase (7350-6900 BC) and the Late Butovo phase (?-6100 BC).

=== Other marsh sites and habitats ===
The settlement Ivannovskoje-7 is located 30 km north-east of Pereslavl-Zalesskiy, on the shore of an ancient lake that became silted up and swampy. Five different cultural layers were found at the site including the Upper Volga culture and Lyalovo culture.

Human bones were also found at the site from a layer dated to 6 350-6 200 B.C. However, radiocarbon dating of the bones gave an age of about 7 500 B.C., with a difference of about 1000 years explained by the combined effect of erosion and flooding. Since the site was under water at the time the bones appeared, a normal burial is out of the question. However, the deceased was buried in mud and during the dry season the layers were worn away by trampling and decay, leaving the bones in the younger layer on the surface. The site later became marshy and the bones were therefore found in the wrong context. However, the bones also represent the uninterrupted occupation of the ancient lake in its various locations.

== Bibliography ==
- Hartz, Sönke; Tereberger, Thomas; Zhilin, Mikhail (2010). New AMS-dates for the Upper Volga Mesolithic and the origin of microblade technology in Europe (PDF). julkaisussa International Yearbook for Ice Age and Stone Age Research - Quartär 57. Rahden/Westf.: Verlag Marie Leidorf GmbH Rahden/Westf. pp. 155–169. ISBN 978-3-86757-923-0.
- Zhilin M.G. (1997). FLINT RAW MATERIAL FROM UPPER VOLGA BASIN AND ITS USE IN FINAL PALAEOLITHIC - NEOLITHIC. julkaisusta: Man and Flint, toimittaneet R. Shild & S. Sulgostowska, Proceedings of the VII Flint Symposium. Varsova: VII Flint Symposium. pp. 331–333.
- Zhilin M.G. (1994). "Archaeological investigations at Ozerki peat bog in 1990-1992, julkaisusta Chernyh I.N. (ed.): Tverskoy Arheologicheskyi Sbornik, ss. 47–52". Tver.
- Zaretskaya, N.E., Zhilin, M.G., Karmanov, V.N. & Uspenskaya, O.N. (2005). Radiocarbon dating of wetland meso-neolithic (PDF). julkaisusta Geochronometria Vol. 24. Gliwice, Poland: Silesian University of Technology. pp. 117–131. ISSN 1897-1695.
