= Kunda culture =

Archaeological culture

- Geographical range: Europe
- Period: Mesolithic Europe
- Dates: c. 8500– c. 5000 BC
- Type site: Kunda, Estonia
- Major sites: Pulli settlement
- Preceded by: Swiderian culture
- Followed by: Narva culture

The Kunda culture, which originated from the Swiderian culture, comprised Mesolithic hunter-gatherer communities of the Baltic forest zone extending eastwards through Latvia into northern Russia, dating to the period 8500–5000 BC according to calibrated radiocarbon dating. It is named after the Estonian town of Kunda, about 110 kilometres (70 mi) east of Tallinn along the Gulf of Finland, near where the first extensively studied settlement was discovered on Lammasmäe Hill and in the surrounding peat bog. The oldest known settlement of the Kunda culture in Estonia is Pulli. The Kunda culture was succeeded by the Narva culture, who used pottery and showed some traces of food production.

== Culture ==
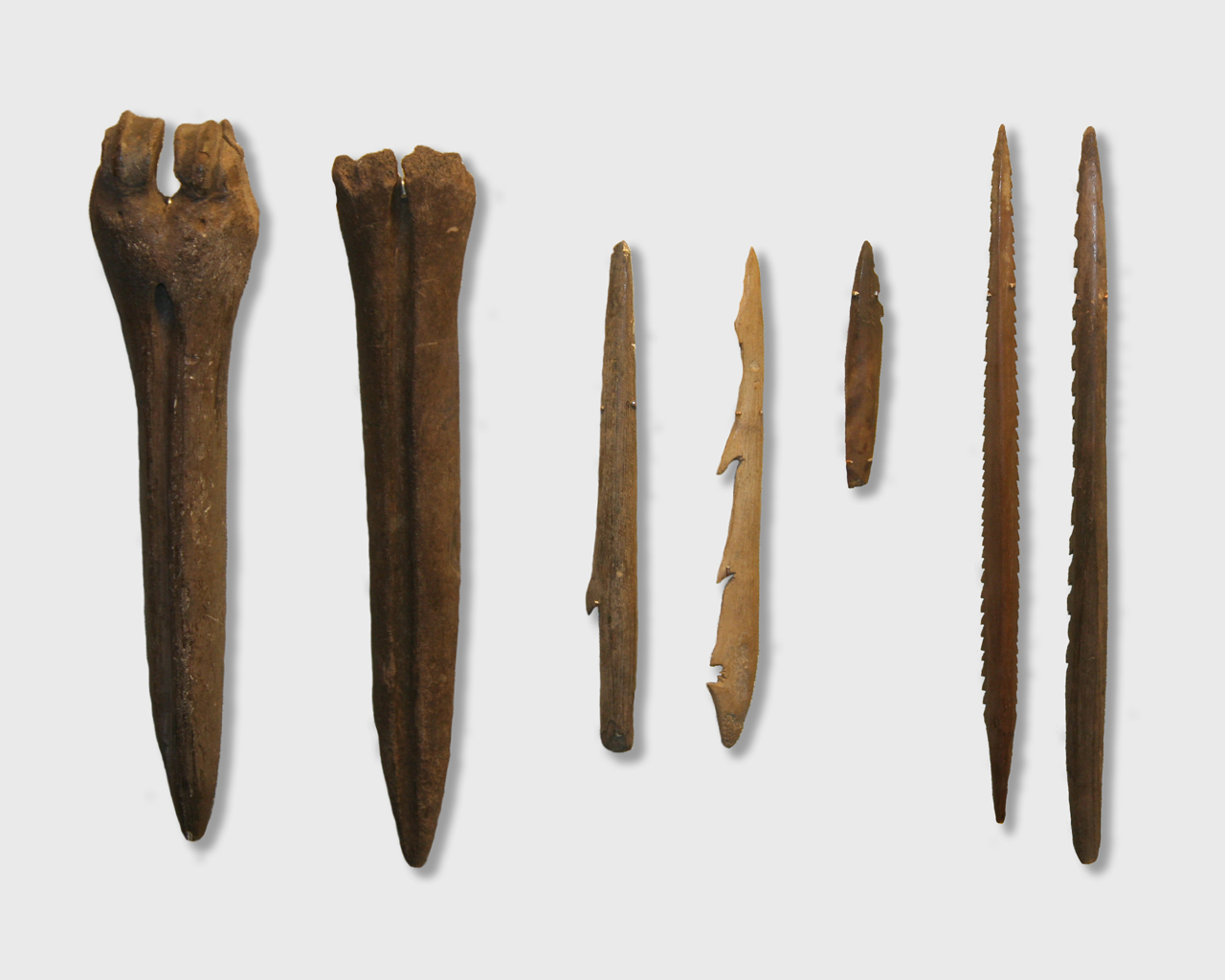
Tools of Kunda Culture

Most Kunda settlements are located near the edge of the forests beside rivers, lakes, or marshes. Elk were extensively hunted, perhaps helped by trained domestic hunting-dogs. On the coast seal hunting is represented. Pike and other fish were taken from the rivers. There is a rich bone and antler industry, especially in relation to fishing gear. Tools were decorated with simple geometric designs, lacking the complexity of the contemporary Maglemosian Culture communities to the southwest.

== Origin of culture ==
The Kunda culture appears to have undergone a transition from the Palaeolithic Swiderian culture located previously over much of the same range. One such transition settlement, Pasieniai 1C in Lithuania, features stone tools of both Late Swiderian and early Kunda. One shape manufactured in both cultures is the retouched tanged point. The final Swiderian is dated 7800–7600 BC by calibrated radiocarbon dating, which is in the Preboreal period, at the end of which time with no gap the early Kunda begins. Evidently the descendants of the Swiderians were the first to settle Estonia when it became habitable. Other post-Swiderian groups extended as far east as the Ural Mountains.

== Genetics ==
Jones et al. (2017) determined, based on one sample (6467-6250 BC) from the Kunda culture and another one from the succeeding Narva culture, closer genetic affinity with Western Hunter-Gatherers (WHGs) than Eastern Hunter-Gatherers (EHGs).

Mittnik et al. (2018) analyzed the remains of a male and female ascribed to the Kunda culture. They found the male to be carrying paternal haplogroup I and maternal haplogroup U5b2c1, while the female carried U4a2. They were found to have "a very close affinity" with WHGs, although with "a significant contribution" from Ancient North Eurasians (ANE). Their ANE ancestry was lower than that of Scandinavian Hunter-Gatherers, indicating that ANE ancestry entered Scandinavia without traversing the Baltic.

Matthieson et al. (2018) analyzed a large number of individuals buried at the Zvejnieki burial ground, most of whom were affiliated with the Kunda culture and the succeeding Narva culture. The mtDNA belonged to haplotypes U5, U4 and U2, the vast majority of the Y-DNA samples belonged to R1b1a1a and I2a1. The results affirmed that the Kunda and Narva cultures were about 70% WHG and 30% EHG. The nearby contemporary Pit–Comb Ware culture was on the contrary found to be about 65% EHG.

Around 3700/3600 BC there was a complete turnover to now y-hg R1a1a1, from 900/800 onward mainly in Estonia with increasing impact of y-hg N-M231 (N1a1).

== Locations of sites ==
- Kunda, Estonia
- Pulli, Estonia
- Luga
- Pasieniai, Lithuania
- Ristola, Finland
- Velizh
- Zvejnieki, Latvia
