= Zvejnieki burial ground =

Stone Age cemetery in northern Latvia

Zvejnieki
- Location within Latvia
- 57.776°N 25.226°E
- Type: Burial ground
- Periods: Mesolithic / Neolithic
- Cultures: Kunda culture, Narva culture, Comb Ware culture, Corded Ware culture
- Location: Lake Burtnieks

History
- Built: 7500 BC
- Abandoned: 2600 BC

The Zvejnieki burial ground is an archaeological site consisting of a large Stone Age (i.e. Mesolithic and Neolithic) cemetery with over 400 burials and associated grave goods. It is located along a drumlin on the northern shore of Lake Burtnieks in northern Latvia.

The site had been known among archaeologists since the nineteenth century. However, it was first explored archaeologically through excavations led by Francis Zagorskis between 1964 and 1978. Before the discovery of a human skull in 1964, the site was used primarily for quarrying gravel. Archaeologists estimate that the site originally contained over 400 burials.

The cemetery contains 330 recorded burials, with roughly equal numbers of male and females. About one third of the burials are children. The principal grave goods are animal tooth pendants, occurring in both adult and child graves. A smaller number of male and female graves contain hunting and fishing equipment, including harpoons, spears, arrowheads and fish-hooks. The earliest burials are dated to the Middle Mesolithic, 8th millennium BCE, but they continue throughout the Stone Age, extending over at least four millennia.

Two sites representing settlements have been identified close to the cemetery: Zvejnieki I (Neolithic) and Zvejnieki II (Mesolithic).

== Archaeogenetics ==
In 2017, researchers successfully extracted the ancient DNA from the petrous bone of six adult individuals buried at Zvejnieki. DNA analysis showed that Burial 121, which was previously thought to be female, was actually male, and that Burials 221 and 137, which were previously thought to male, were actually female.

DNA analysis shows that the people from Zvejnieki appear to have maintained genetic continuity from the Mesolithic to the Neolithic and likely adopted Neolithic practices through cultural diffusion, as the populations showed little genetic affinity for the Anatolian farmers that migrated to large parts of Europe during the Neolithic. However, a late Neolithic individual from Zvejnieki, Burial 137, appears to show some genetic affinity for the Caucasus hunter-gathers typified by an ancient DNA sample from Satsurblia Cave.

Burial #	Period	Culture	Dating	Gender	mtDNA	Y-DNA	Source
313	Mesolithic	Kunda culture	8,417-8,199 BP	♀	U5a1c	NA	Jones et al, 2017
93	Mesolithic	Narva culture	7,791-7,586 BP	♂	U2e1	R1b1a1a-P297*	Jones et al, 2017
121	Mesolithic		7,252-6,802 BP	♂	U5a2d	R1b1b	Jones et al, 2017
124	Neolithic		6,201-5,926 BP	♂	U4a1		Jones etal, 2017
221	Neolithic	Comb Ware culture	6,179-5,750 BP	♀	U4	NA	Jones etal, 2017
137	Neolithic	Corded Ware culture	5,039-4,626 BP	♀	U5a1	NA	Jones etal, 2017

In 2018, Mathieson et al. published an analysis of a large number of individuals buried at the Zvejnieki burial ground from ca. 7500 BC to 2700 BC. The Y-DNA of 15 males was extracted, with 8 carrying haplogroup R1b1a1a, 6 carrying I2a1 and various subclades of it (particularly I2a1a1), and one carrying Q1a2. With regards to mtDNA, every individual successfully analysed (both male and female) carried subclades of haplogroup U (particularly subclades of U2, U4 and U5).

== Burials ==
The burials at Zvejnieki include evidence for secondary burial: that people were intentionally using remains left by previous generations in their graves. The most typical way of burying their dead was in an oval shaped pit with grey fill. There were instances of darker soil from previous graves and burials that cut into other ones. This could be because of the want for the dead to be connected to their ancestors in the afterlife. By being dug into a previous grave, they can remain with their loved ones forever. The darker soil from other graves could indicate that they were of higher status. It can also mean that this grave is not to be disturbed any further (see Burial 316 and 317). Disturbing previous graves at Zvejnieki was done more often than not. This could be in part due to the fact that they did not build permanent buildings. By incorporating their dead, or the past, into their burials, they were making it as permanent as it could be.

The most recent burials are listed here with what is known about them. Due to looting that has taken place, many do not have confirmations on what gender or age they were. Artifacts appear in some, as well as what was once clothing in a few. Some graves have multiple individuals within them, but it is still hard to say whether they were related or just buried together.

=== Burial 309 ===
This was a secondary burial. The individual had been disturbed, and there is no conclusion on gender or age. Only the skull and upper part of the thoracic cage was present.

=== Burial 310 ===
This burial had been disturbed, and there is no conclusion on what gender or age the individual was. Only lower limbs and the pelvis were preserved.

=== Burial 311 ===
This burial had been greatly disturbed but with the placement of the vertebrae, as well as the presence of phalanges from the left hand they know that it was a primary burial.

=== Burial 312 ===
This person was found in the first excavation but could not be completed. Before they returned, it was looted. From the first excavation they determined that it contained four individuals, three adults and one child. There were also flint artifacts found, but it is unclear what their use was.

=== Burial 313 ===
This person was a 33 to 37 year old woman. They found a full skeleton that was placed on its back. She was a primary deposit, and the space was filled. There were a few animal bones found, but these may have just been a coincidence.

=== Burial 314 ===
This person was over 35 years old, and a female. This was a primary deposit, and the space was filled.

=== Burial 315 ===
There was no gender or age determined for this person. While they know that the individual was placed on their back, the remains were not well preserved.

=== Burials 316 and 317 ===
The most well-known is the double burial of 316 and 317. Archaeologists have determined it to be one female (on the left) and one male (on the right). Their grave was dug into five older burials on the site. They were then covered with a darker, older soil which would have been from an ancestors’ grave nearby, roughly 20 to 100 meters away. The darker soil may have been an indication of higher status or a way to show the grave should no longer be disturbed.

The female, Burial 316, was 36 to 40 years old. She was found with a plethora of grave goods. She had 120 amber pendants that went from the upper part of her body to just above the knees, two amber rings that were near her jaw, and 40 bone beads that were near the knees as well as other places. The collection she was buried with makes her one of the richest amber graves in the Baltic area.

The male, Burial 317, was 25 to 30 years old. He shows signs of being wrapped tightly when buried. His bones had limited movement, and are compressed.1 Around his cranium, they found a large presence of ochre which they believe could be from a clay mask that was painted. This individual was lying on top of a stone that was 15 cm. It was situated under his pelvic bone.

=== Burial 318 ===
This burial only yielded a forearm and hand, so no age or gender has been determined. They think that this might have been disturbed when Burials 316 and 317 were dug.

=== Burials 319 and 320 ===
This double burial was of young children; neither of the genders were determined. Burial 319 was around five years old, and Burial 320 was around two and a half years old. Eleven tooth pendants were found around them, and they were covered in ochre.

=== Burial 321 ===
This individual was between 16 and 17 years old, but the gender is undetermined. It was a primary deposition.

=== Burial 322 ===
This individual was between 35 and 40 years old, and a female. This burial was a primary deposit, but there have been disturbances from secondary burials around and on top of it.

=== Burials 323 and 325 ===
This burial also consists of two individuals but is not as lavish as the previous. Burial 323 is of a child around the age of four. The sex cannot be determined for this young individual.

Burial 325 is of a male that was 30 to 35 years old. This double burial was a primary deposit, and there were no artifacts found with them in the grave. While there is no obvious reason to think they were deposited at the same time, there have been no disturbances after placement. There was also little movement of the bones for Burial 325 which could indicate that it was wrapped or covered.

=== Burial 324 ===
This burial has two individuals, but they were believed to be immature. 324a was a newborn and 324b was between two and three years old. Neither have a determined sex.

=== Burial 326 ===
This burial does not have a determined age or gender. They have determined that it was a primary deposit, and most likely was disturbed by the building of a house.

=== Burial 328 ===
This individual was a male between the ages of 20 and 25. It was a filled-in burial and no artifacts were found with him.

=== Burial 329 ===
This individual has no confirmed sex or age, but from their fully erupted third molars we know that it is an adult. It was a primary burial.

=== Burial 330 ===
This burial was found while excavating Burial 323-325. They concluded that this grave was dug into while depositing 323-325.

== See also ==
- Deriivka
- Motala § Archaeogenetics
- Khvalynsk § Archaeogenetics
- Iron Gates Mesolithic
- Samara culture § Genetics

== Sources ==
- Mathieson, Iain (February 21, 2018). "The Genomic History of Southeastern Europe". Nature. 555 (7695). Nature Research: 197–203. Bibcode:2018Natur.555..197M. doi:10.1038/nature25778. PMC 6091220. PMID 29466330.
