= Iron Gates Mesolithic =

Mesolithic archaeological culture

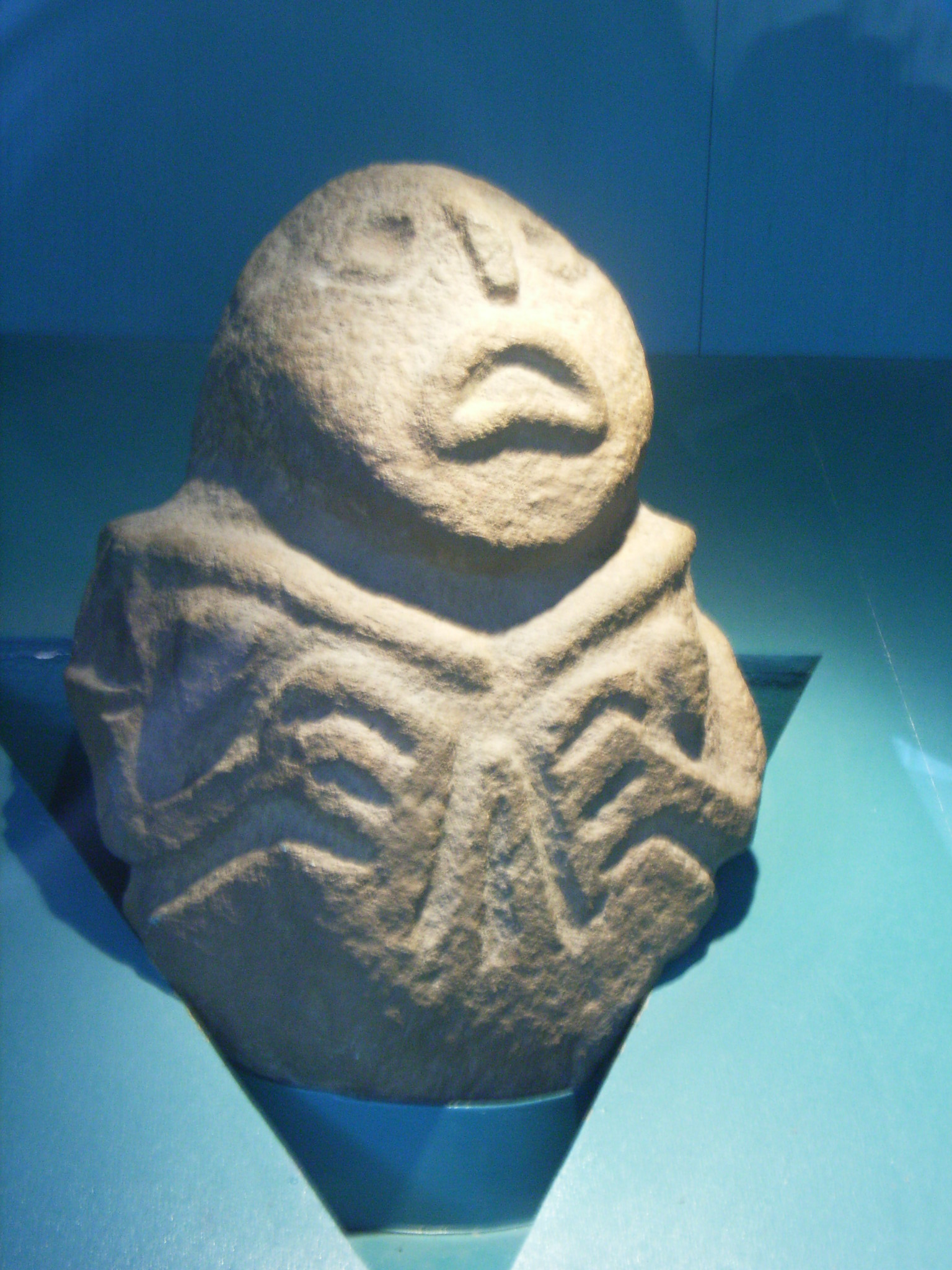
- Alternative names: Iron Gates culture; Lepenski Vir culture
- Geographical range: Iron Gates, Danube Valley
- Period: Mesolithic
- Dates: 13,000–6000 BCE
- Type site: Lepenski Vir
- Preceded by: Epigravettian
- Followed by: First Temperate Neolithic

The Iron Gates Mesolithic is a Mesolithic archaeological culture dated to between 13,000 and 6,000 years cal BCE, in the Iron Gates region of the Danube River, in modern Romania and Serbia.

The people who inhabited the Iron Gates area during this period of time have been surmised, through archaeological discoveries, to have lived a hunter-gatherer lifestyle, living off food they gathered from the land or from the Danube River. Varying burial practices have also been discovered.

Major sites within this archaeological complex include Lepenski Vir. Despite a foraging economy, stages at this site dated at c. 6300–6000 BCE have been described as "the first city in Europe", due to its permanency, organisation, and the sophistication of its architecture and construction techniques. Lepenski Vir consists of one large settlement with around ten satellite villages. Numerous piscine sculptures and peculiar architecture have been found at the site.

== Archaeology ==
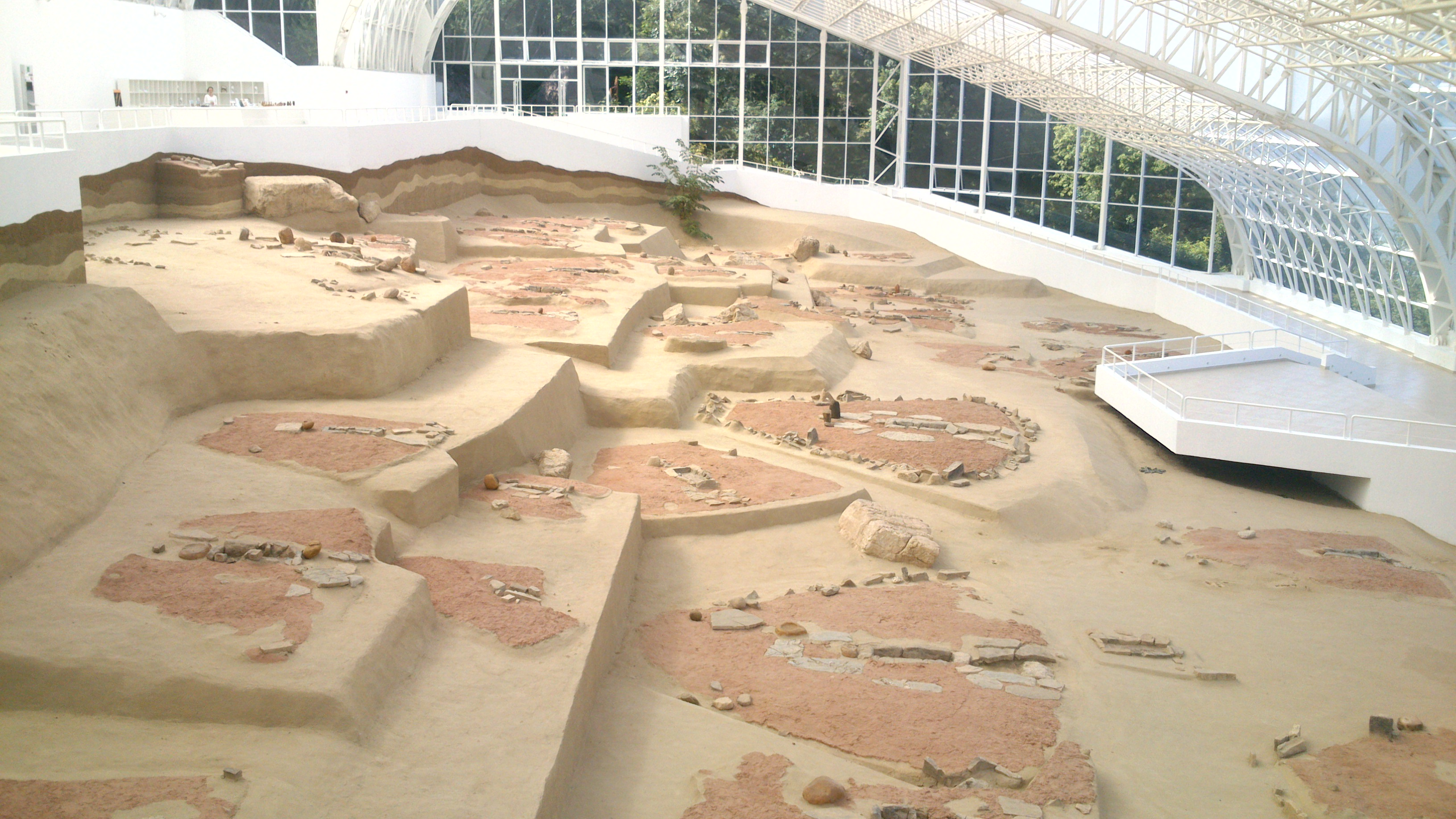
Lepenski Vir museum

=== Survey and Site Discovery ===
During the 1960s to the 1980s the Yugoslav and Romanian governments constructed two hydroelectric dams along the Danube River. The first dam (Iron Gates I) was constructed between 1964 and 1971, and the second (Iron Gates II) between 1977 and 1984. Archaeological surveys during this period led to the discovery of over 50 caves and other sites in this area, which together with more excavations led to many discoveries of ancient artefacts, burial sites and art. The study of these findings, through scientific methods such as carbon dating and isotope analysis, revealed that they date back to the Mesolithic and Early Neolithic periods.

Most of the sites discovered during the time the dams were being built are now submerged underwater due to the dams; however since the 1990s new excavations have recommenced.

=== Methods and Practices ===
Improvements in archaeological techniques have led to increasingly accurate findings and more information of the location and people who inhabited the Iron Gates during the Mesolithic period. Carbon dating and stable isotope analysis from soil samples and human remains from burial sites have allowed archaeologists to more accurately determine the time period these people lived in and the genetics of the people who resided in the Iron Gates Mesolithic. One example of this is the use of isotopic analysis of nitrogen and sulphur to determine the diets of the people in comparison to other parts of Europe.

=== Major Artefacts/Discoveries ===
Many artefacts have been found in this area, including decorated objects such as tools made from stone, bone and antlers, with decorations and stone artefacts (ornamental boulders, altars and sculptures). Major discoveries include various sites and towns, most notably Lepenski Vir, which is an Iron Gates settlement containing several trapezoidal buildings and which has revealed information on settlements in the area.

== History ==
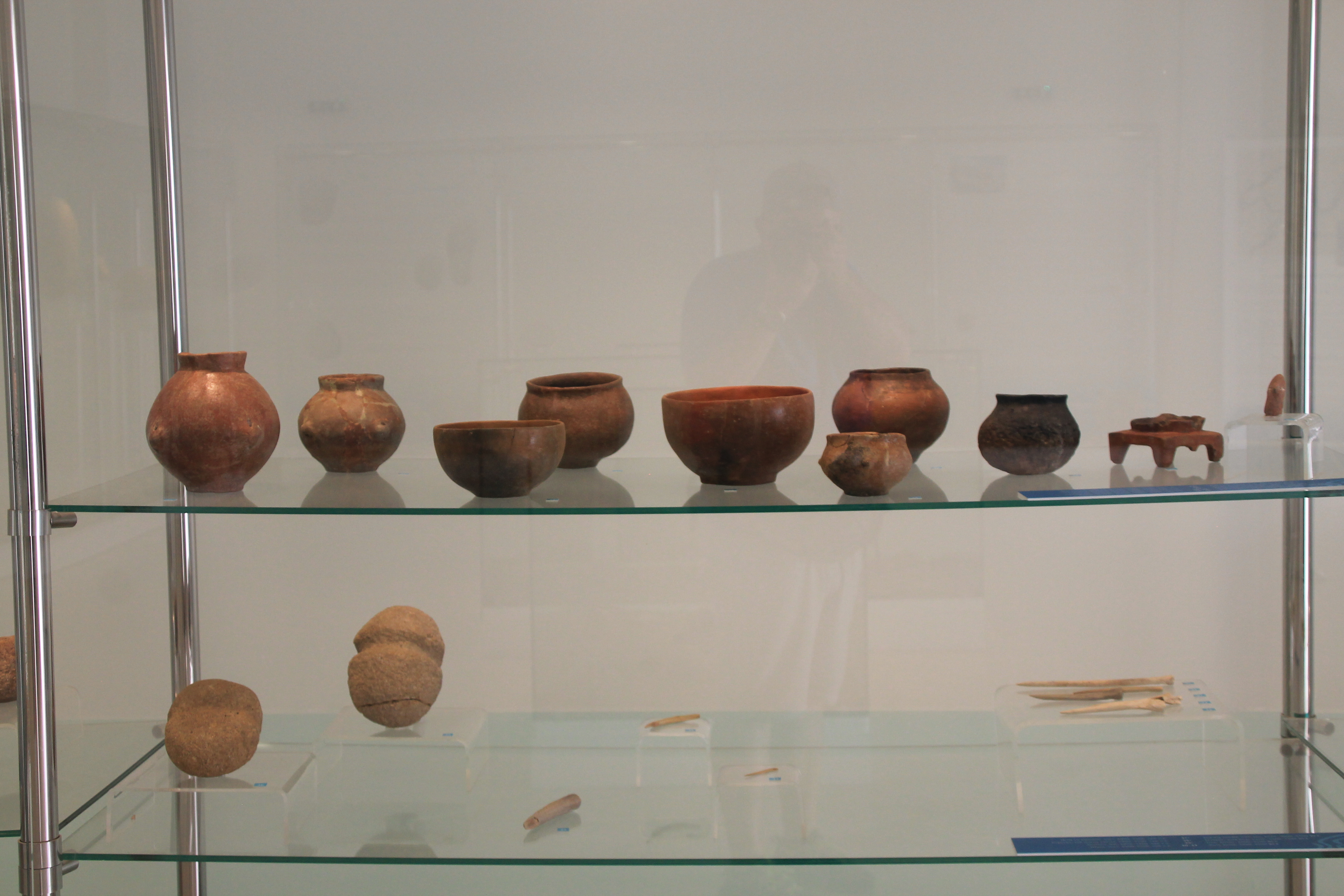
Pottery and other artefacts from Lepenski Vir

The chronology of the Iron Gates Mesolithic is a bit contentious due to discrepancies in the use of terminology and dates produced by carbon-dating and isotope analysis. However, based on more modern radiocarbon dates, the Mesolithic period in the Iron Gates region lasts from approximately 13,000 cal BC to 6,000 cal BC. This is then split into three stages called the Early, Middle and Late Mesolithic.

From the Mesolithic sites observed, it has been discerned that the hunter-gatherer sites show increasing sedentism, especially during the early Holocene period (around 7,600 cal BC) when the people living in caves and rock shelters began to leave to settle in more permanent communities by the Danube River. This almost coincides with the shift from Early to Middle Mesolithic; however some historians regard this event as the true beginning of the Mesolithic, and that before this was the 'Epipalaeolithic'. This shift from a more nomadic lifestyle to a permanent settlement caused the people of this area to depend more on the river for food, which can be seen through an increased amount of nitrogen isotopes in the bodies from this period as well as an increased representation of fish in art, sculptures and decorations.

=== Archaeogenetics ===
A 2017 doctoral thesis published by University of Mainz and 2018 study published in Nature included an analysis of a large number of individuals from the Iron Gates Mesolithic (from Lepenski Vir, Ajmana, Hajdučka Vodenica, Padina, Velešnica, Vlasac in Serbia and Cuina Turcului, Icoana, Ostrovul Corbului, Schela Cladovei in Romania) dating from 9500 BC to 5500 BC. They were most closely related to Western European hunter-gatherers, but with some additional affinity toward Eastern European hunter-gatherers and Anatolian hunter-gatherers. Their most common maternal haplogroup was U5, typical of European hunter-gatherers, but they also carried haplogroups U4, K1, and a single case of H13. Their paternal haplogroups were I and R, which predominated in other European hunter-gatherers as well. Where a finer classification was possible, the R was specifically R1b1a-L754 (not belonging to subclade R1b1a1a-P297), and the I belonged to I2a-L460. In 2022 studies was considered that the Southeastern European Hunter Gatherers, represented by the Iron Gates HGs, were separated from the Central and Western European HGs "since ~ 20 thousand years ago".

== Culture ==
=== Diet ===
The diet of the people of the Iron Gates Mesolithic relied heavily upon the Danube River, which was a key element of the life of these people. The regular findings of fish bones in the Iron Gates, combined with the increased nitrogen isotopes when compared to other communities in Europe, reveal the people's dependence on the marine life for food. The Danube River contained many different fish during this Mesolithic period, including sturgeon, however the most common fish consumed were Cyprinus carpio (carp) and Silurus glanis (catfish), due to their year-round presence in the river compared to other seasonal fish.

Despite this, a wide variety of animals were also consumed, deduced by animal remains in the towns of the Iron Gates, revealing that large herbivores such as red and roe deers, pigs and aurochs were hunted for meat. Other animals were also hunted for their fur or feathers, however from the Romanian-British excavations at these sites, it was discovered that fish bones still outnumbered the bones from these other animals suggesting that this was a large part of their diet.

Like many hunter-gatherer societies, winter provided challenges with food availability. The solution for this in the Iron Gates was the domestication of large amounts of dogs, which were eaten when food was low. This was seen by the many dog bones found with scorch marks and butchery marks on them.

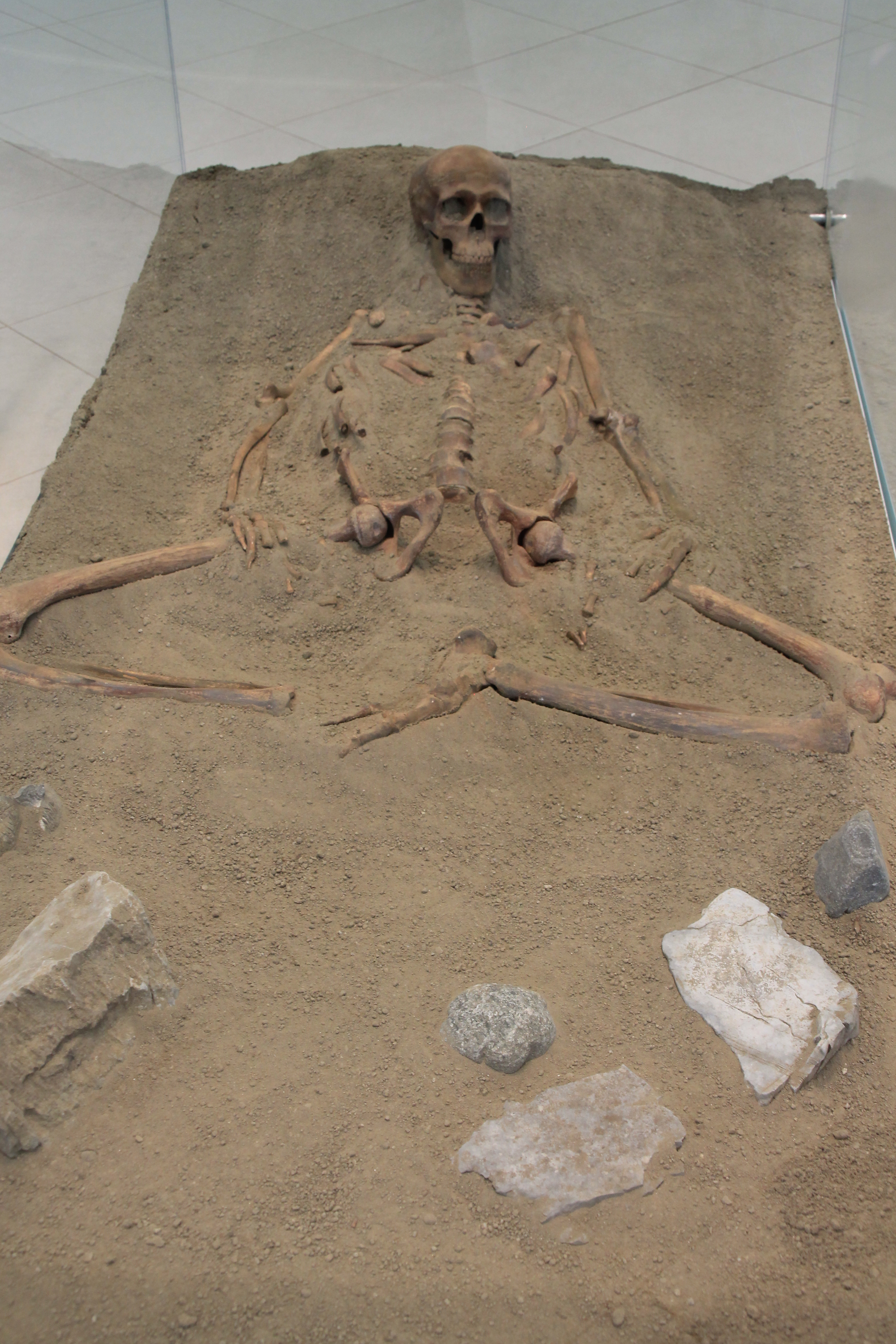
Example of burial in which the person was found with crossed legs

=== Burial Practices ===
Several different types of burials have been seen at various sites in the Iron Gates including primary and secondary inhumation, collective burials, and cremation.

In the case of primary inhumations, similar to modern-day burials, a majority of the Iron Gate burials consisted of the person being in a supine position, with their hands laying on their sides or on their chest. There are other cases in which various limbs are flexed while the body remains in the supine position and in extreme cases there have been burials discovered at Padina, Vlasac and Lepenski Vir with crossed legs, which suggests that the bodies were buried in graves too small for them. Secondary inhumations involves the burial of separate body parts prior to the body being decomposed. There were many examples of this technique in the Iron Gates, with the secondary burial of crania and jawbones being widespread. Instances of collective burial has been observed at some sites within this region as well as evidence of cremation, however there is only one site (Vlasac) in the Iron Gates that provides this evidence of cremation.

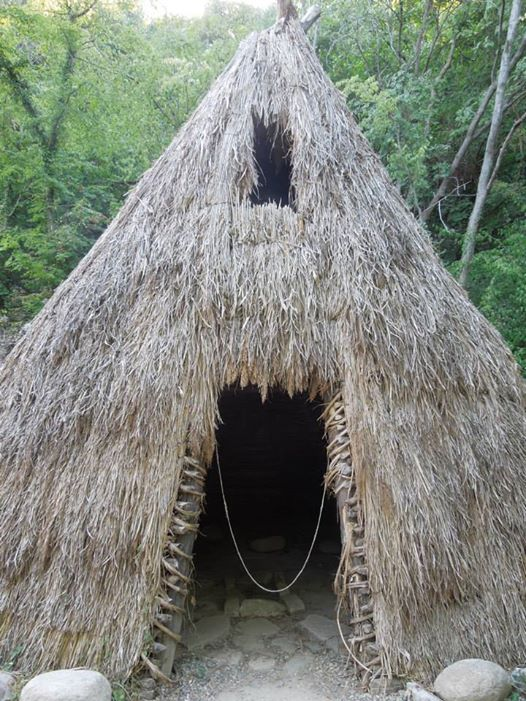
Example of a pit house thought to be used in the Iron Gates during this time

Most burials in the Iron Gates Mesolithic are hard to determine due to no observable characters on the surface, however some burials are below low stone mounds or encircled by large stones. The people of the Iron Gates have sometimes been found to have objects with them in their graves, including animal and human skulls, antlers, tools and body ornaments. However, some of the bone objects found in burials can't be considered burial goods, due to the Iron Gates Mesolithic people's often burying people in areas previously used for other burials and settlement. The most notable object found in burials are marine shells and carp pharyngeal teeth beads, which were worn on clothes.

=== Architecture ===
Various examples of architecture have been discovered in the Iron Gates Mesolithic sites, most notably various remains of houses and hearths. Buildings in Lepenski Vir, one of the largest Mesolithic towns in the Iron Gates, were of a trapezoidal shape and had floors of plaster, which were also seen in other Mesolithic towns such as Schela Cladovei and Vlasac. The houses discovered at these sites were generally small pit houses.

The hearths discovered at these locations generally consisted of a rectangular frame and a border made from large stones, however not all hearths had this border. Some of these hearths were found surrounded by traces of floors and thus some hearths in these towns were inside houses while some were outside.

=== Art ===
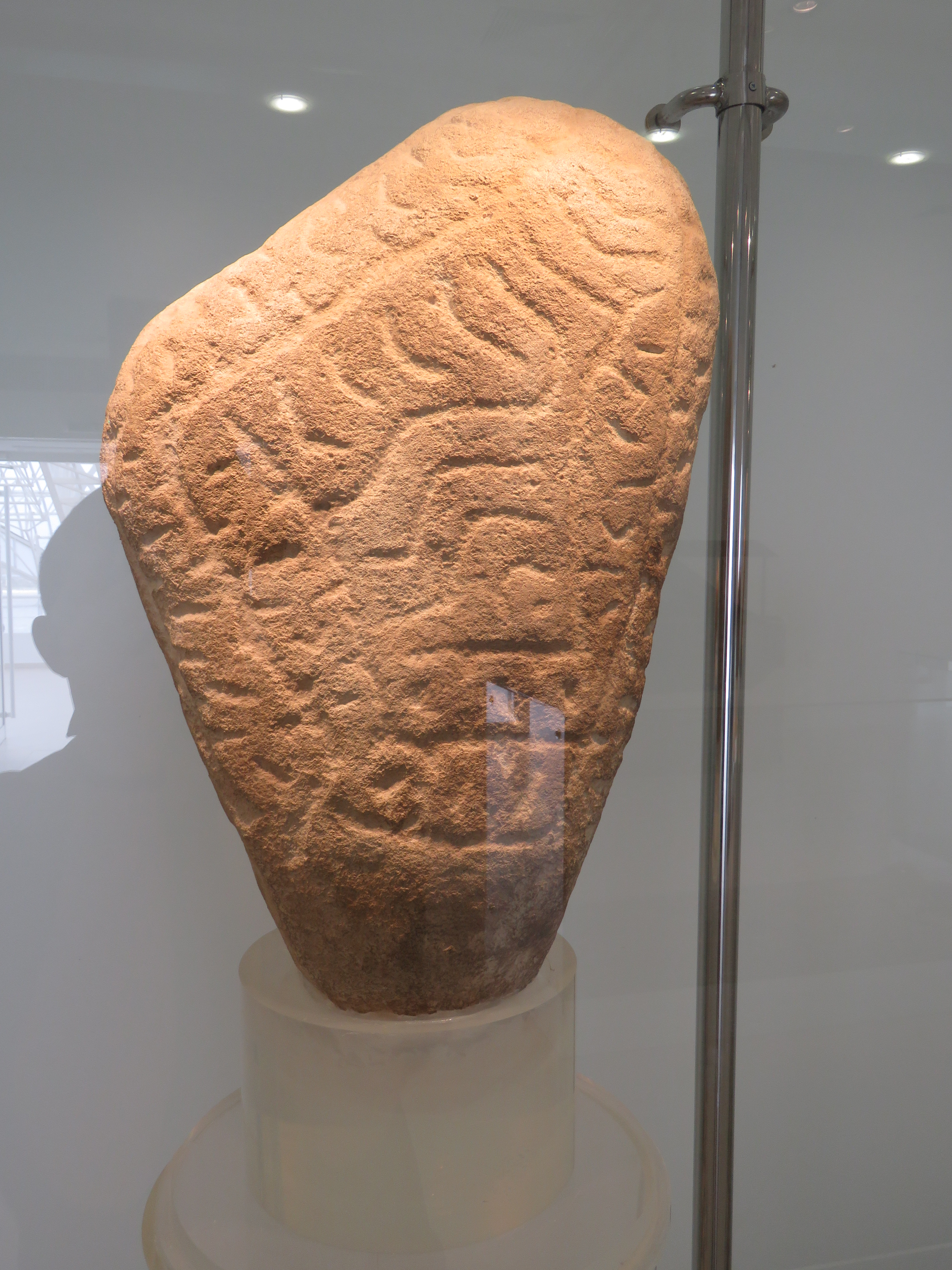
Sculpture with abstract engravings

The Iron Gates Mesolithic excavations have revealed several examples of ornamental boulders, sculptures and altars. The Lepenski Vir site shows many of these examples, with these artworks made from coarse grained sandstone pebbles and rocks, revealing carvings of heads, shells and several recurring motifs such as meanders, fishbone and plaits. The most prominent carvings on these ornamental sculptures and alters, was the heads consisting of eyebrows, eyes, ears, noses and mouths and containing Ichthyoid influences, shown from the scales some of these sculptures had, supporting the importance of the Danube River on these cultures.

=== Clothing ===
The people of the Iron Gates Mesolithic have been found to wear decorative adornments sewn onto their clothes. The adornments consisted of shells, animal teeth and bones, and antler. Shells from local aquatic life such as snails and molluscs, were sewn on clothes by putting a small hole in the shell. Beads and pendants made from bone and antler have been found with buried skeletons, as well as pharyngeal teeth from fish and red-deer canines, which were sewn onto cloth and leather and thus worn.

== Technology ==
Technology in the Mesolithic era of the Iron Gates region consisted mostly of various tools and weapons made from bone, red-deer antlers and boar tusks. Tools dated to the Late Mesolithic included hoes, awls, arrowheads, and scrapers all of which were made from the materials mentioned above. Bones and antlers would be shaped, carved and rounded into points for various weapons and tools.

== External relationships ==
Evidence from burials and artefacts have revealed that the people inhabiting the Iron Gates Mesolithic did have contact with other groups. Evidence of trade or some sort of exchange is seen through the presence of marine shells which are found in the Adriatic or Aegean seas, which most likely wasn't gathered by the Iron Gates people themselves.

Relationships with these other communities weren't always peaceful, as bodies found in graves in some locations have been found to have died from arrow wounds and broken bones, such as skull fractures, which suggest that there was occasional violence in the area between different communities.

== Gallery ==
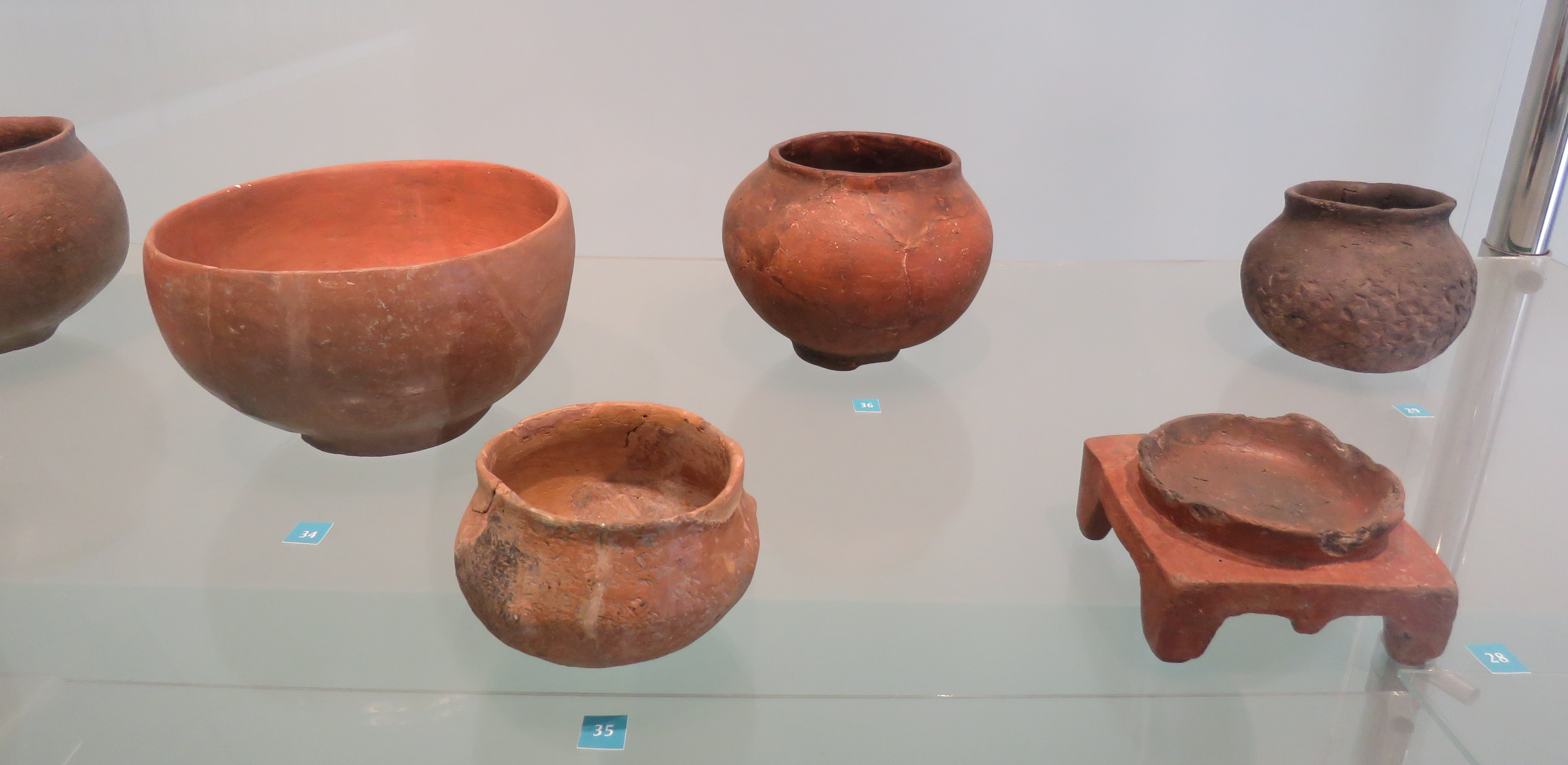

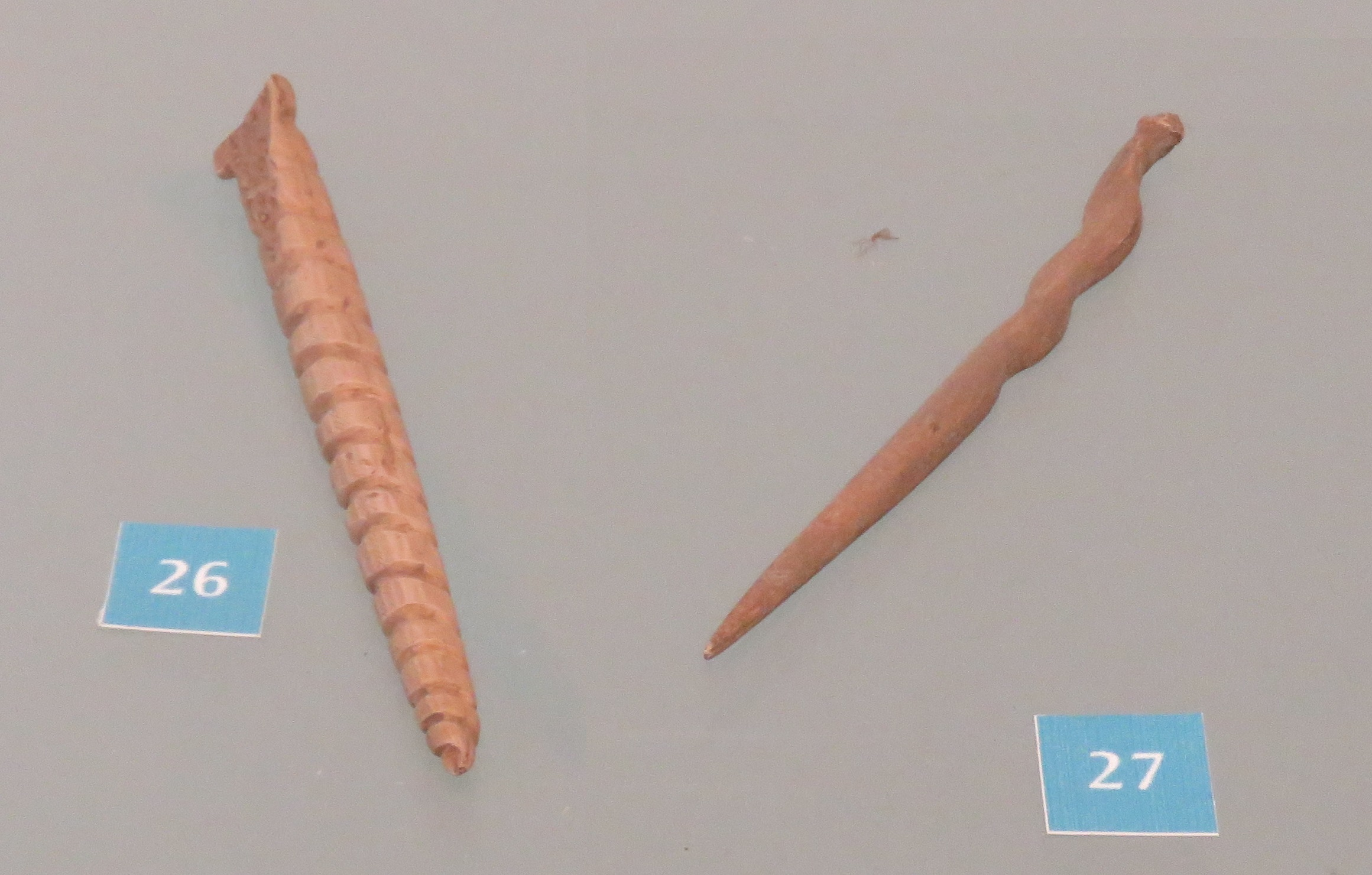

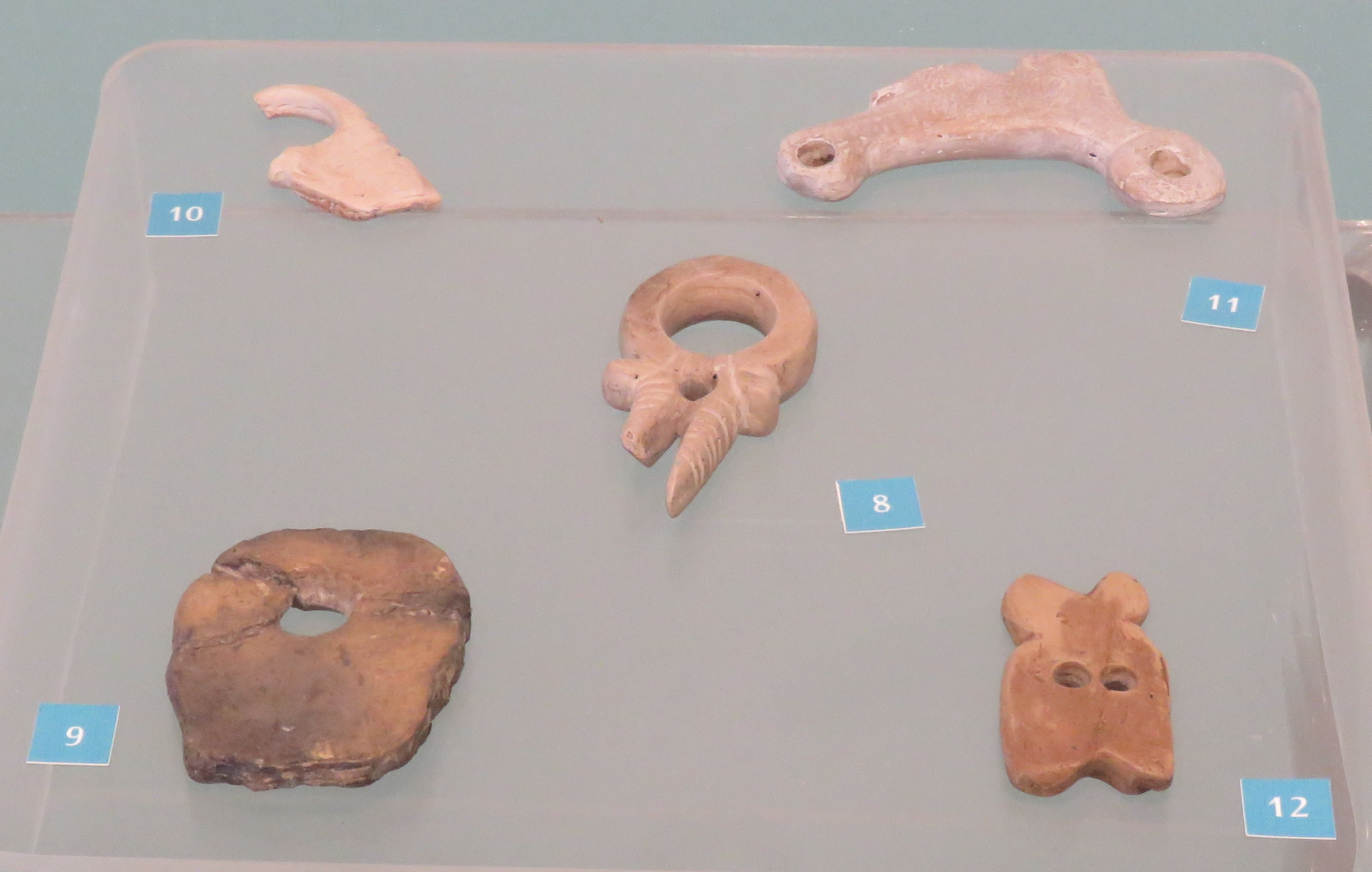

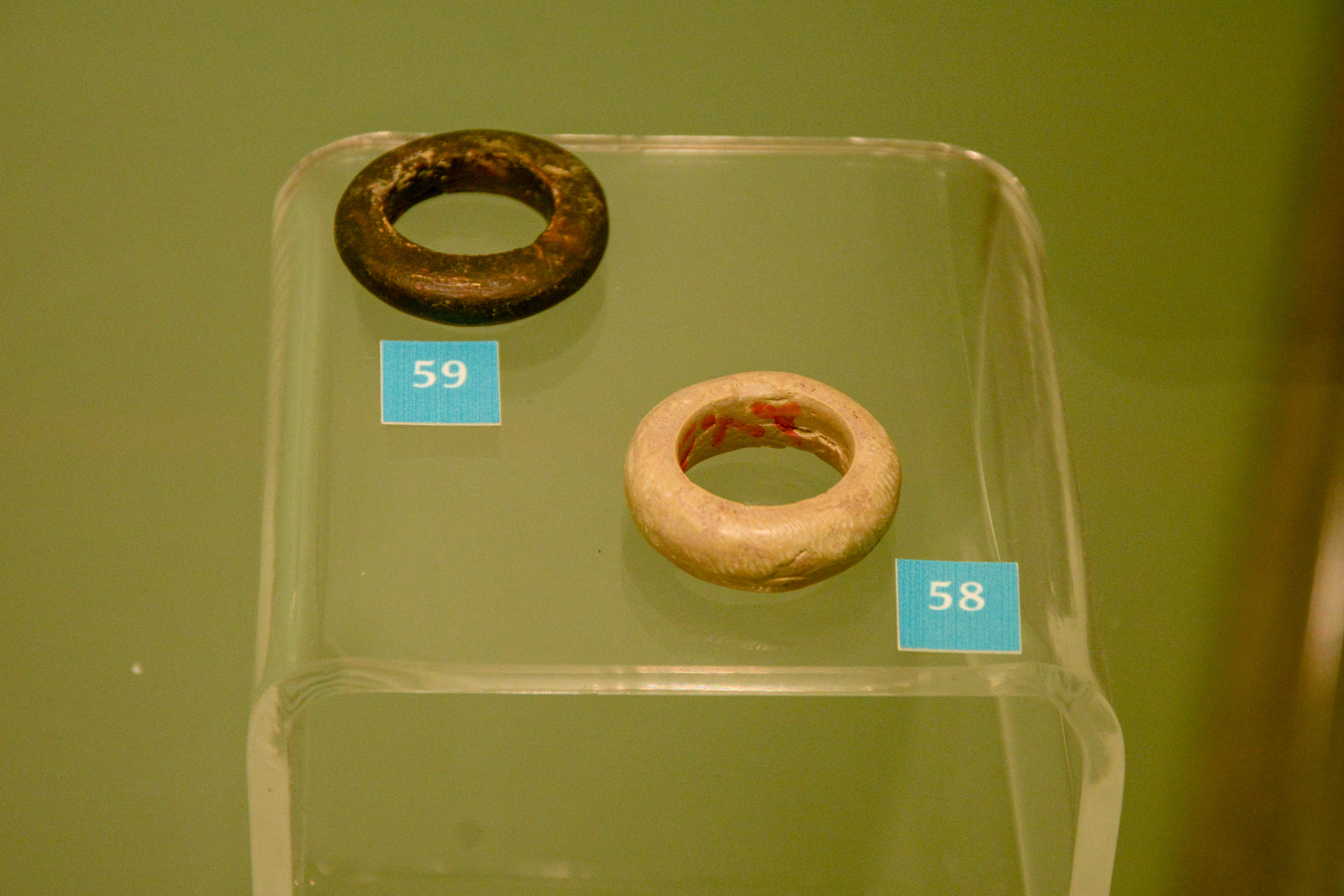

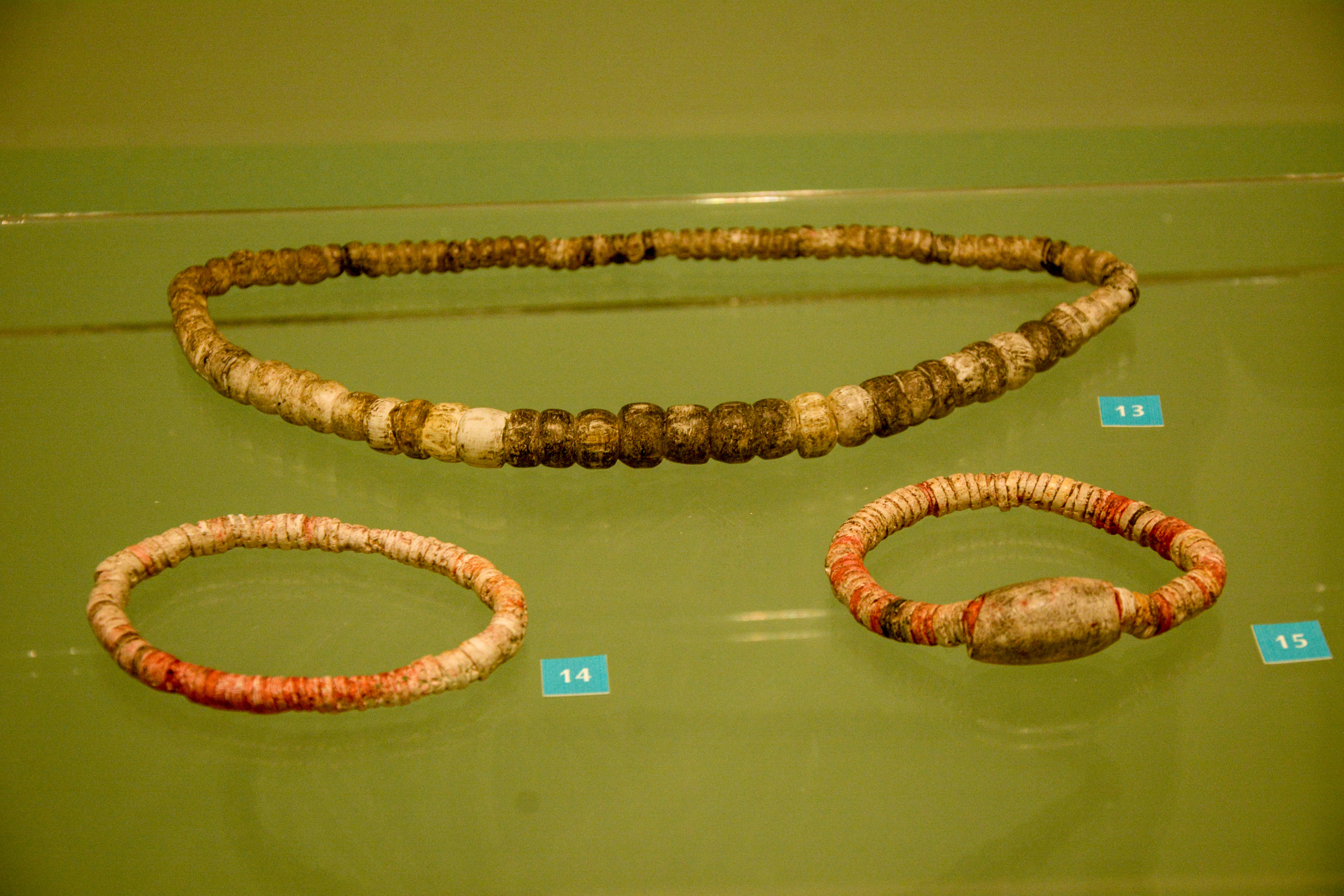

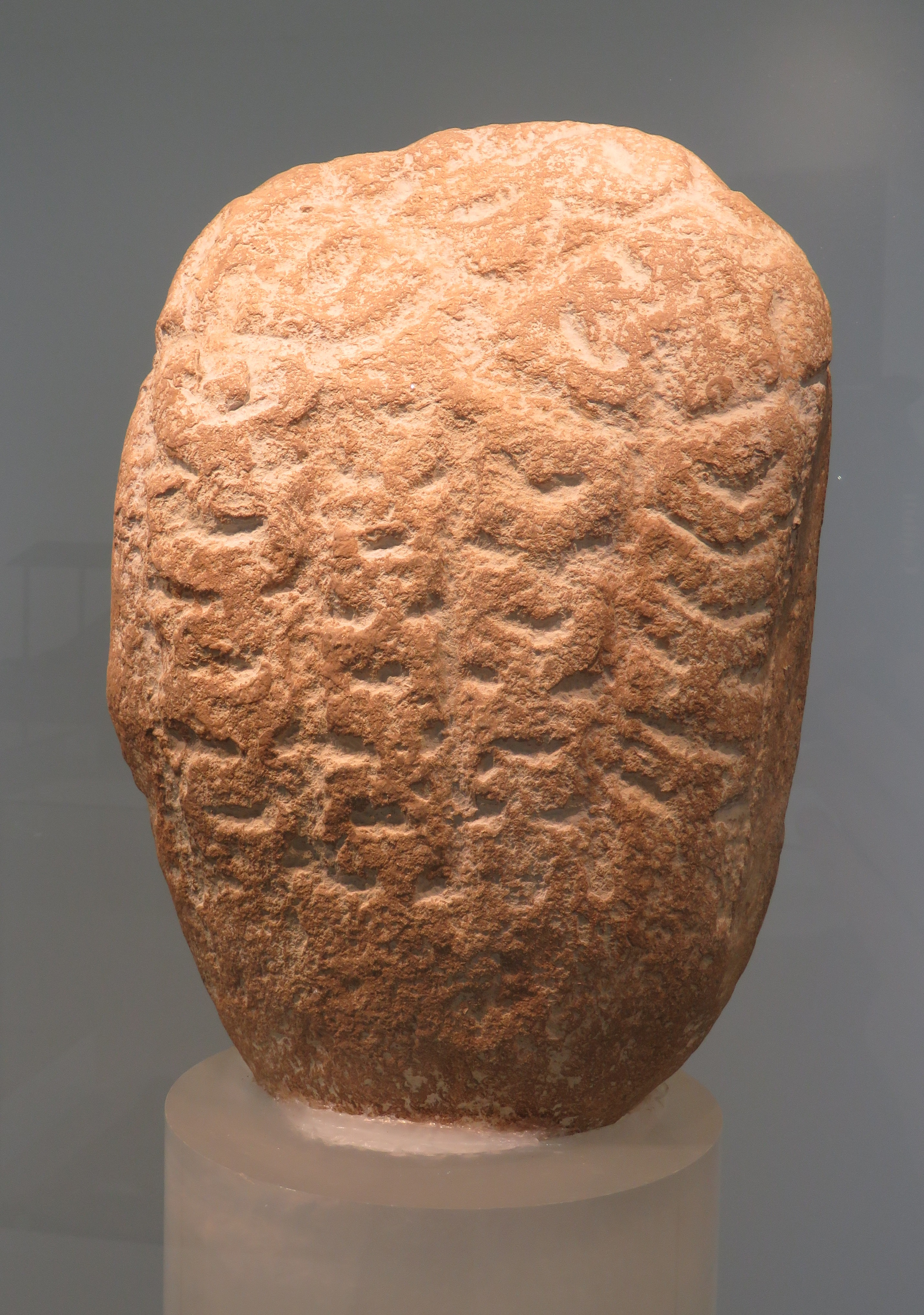

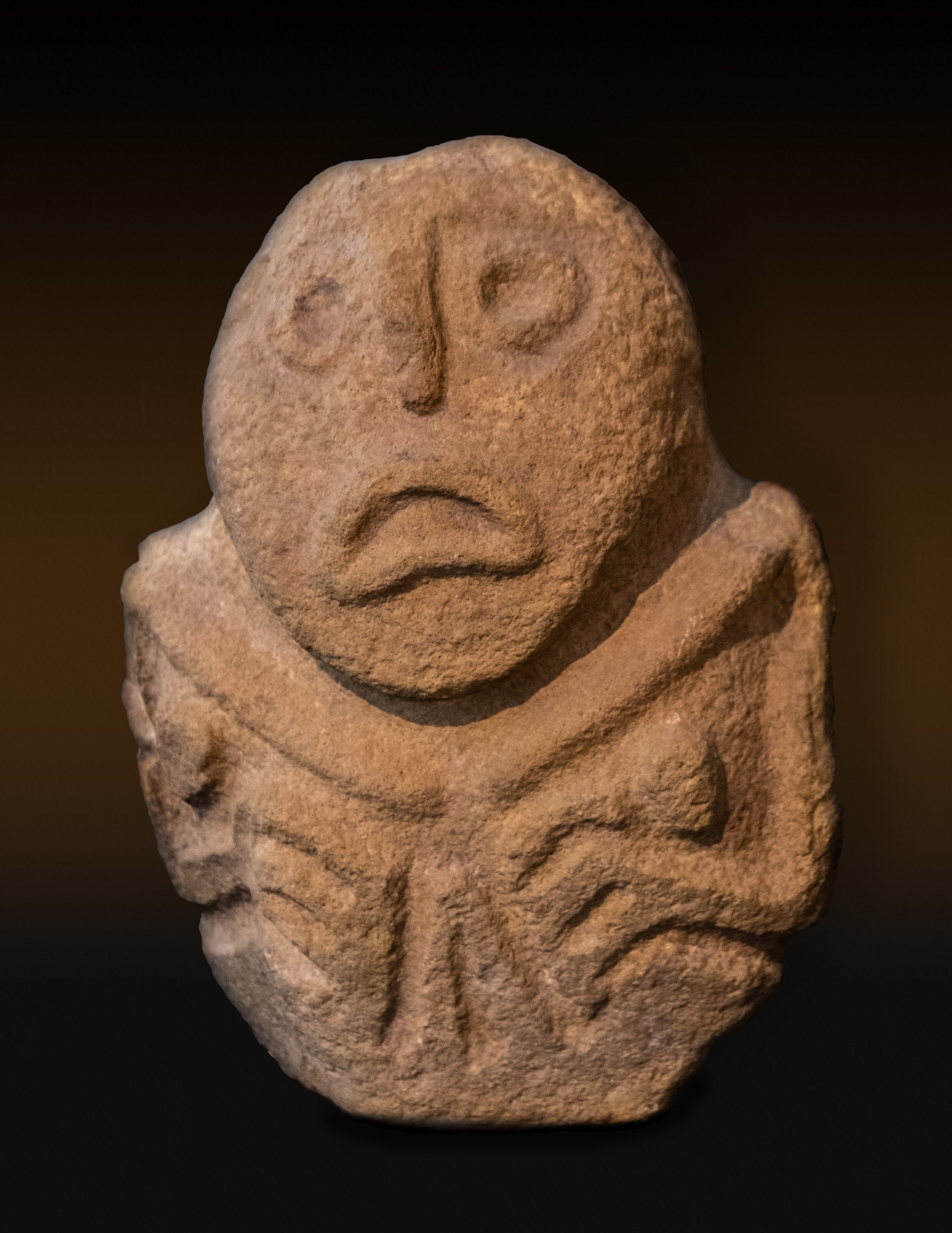

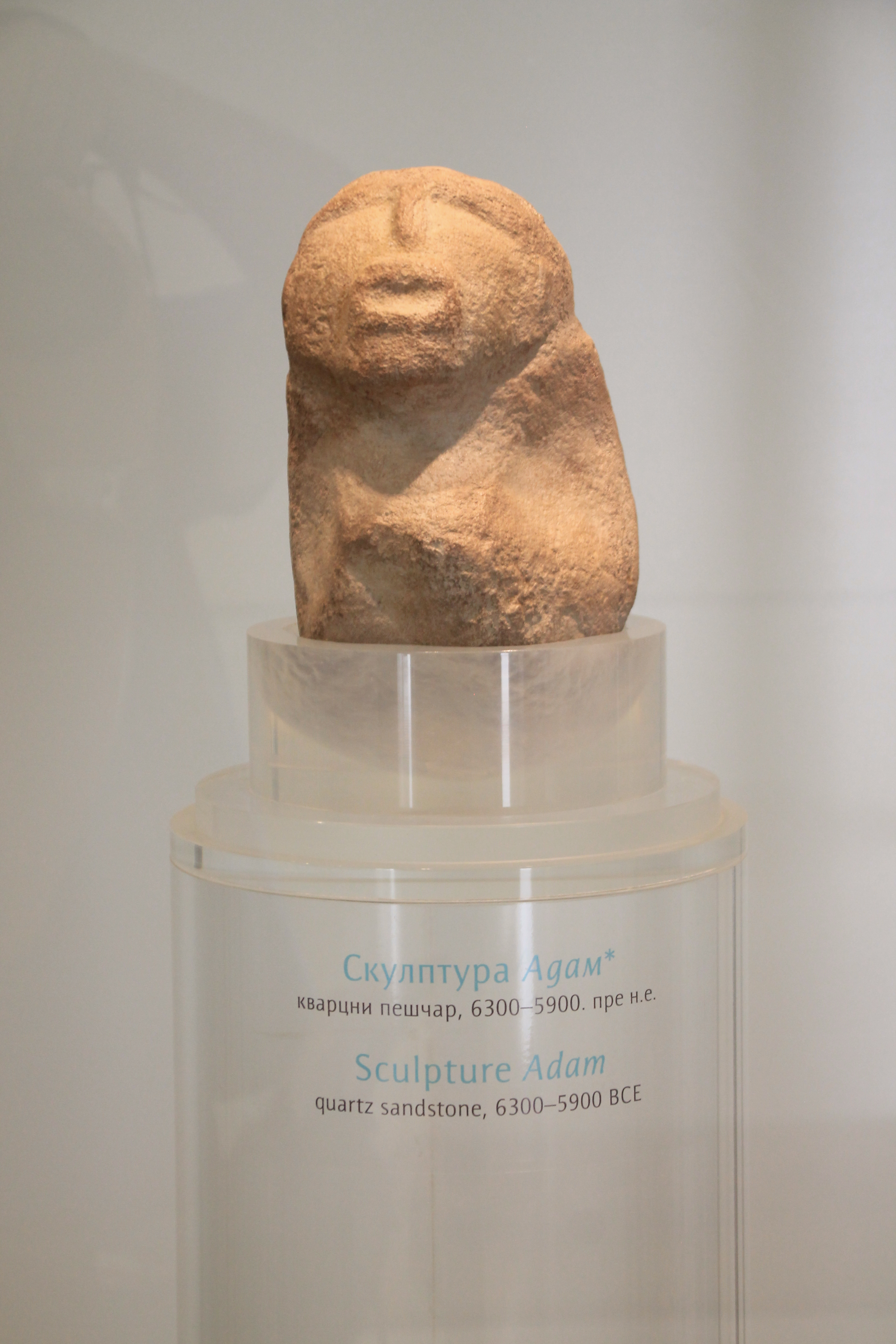

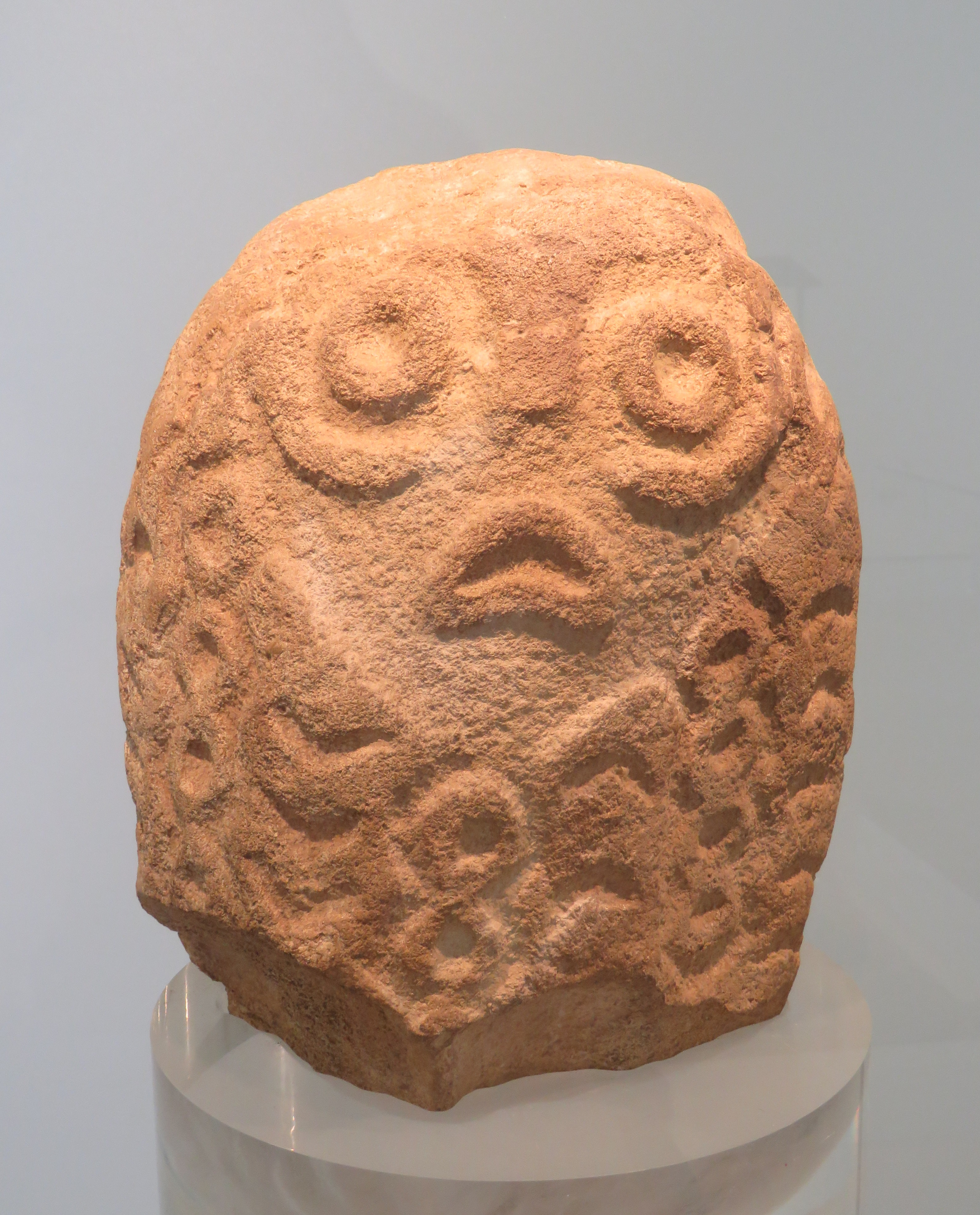

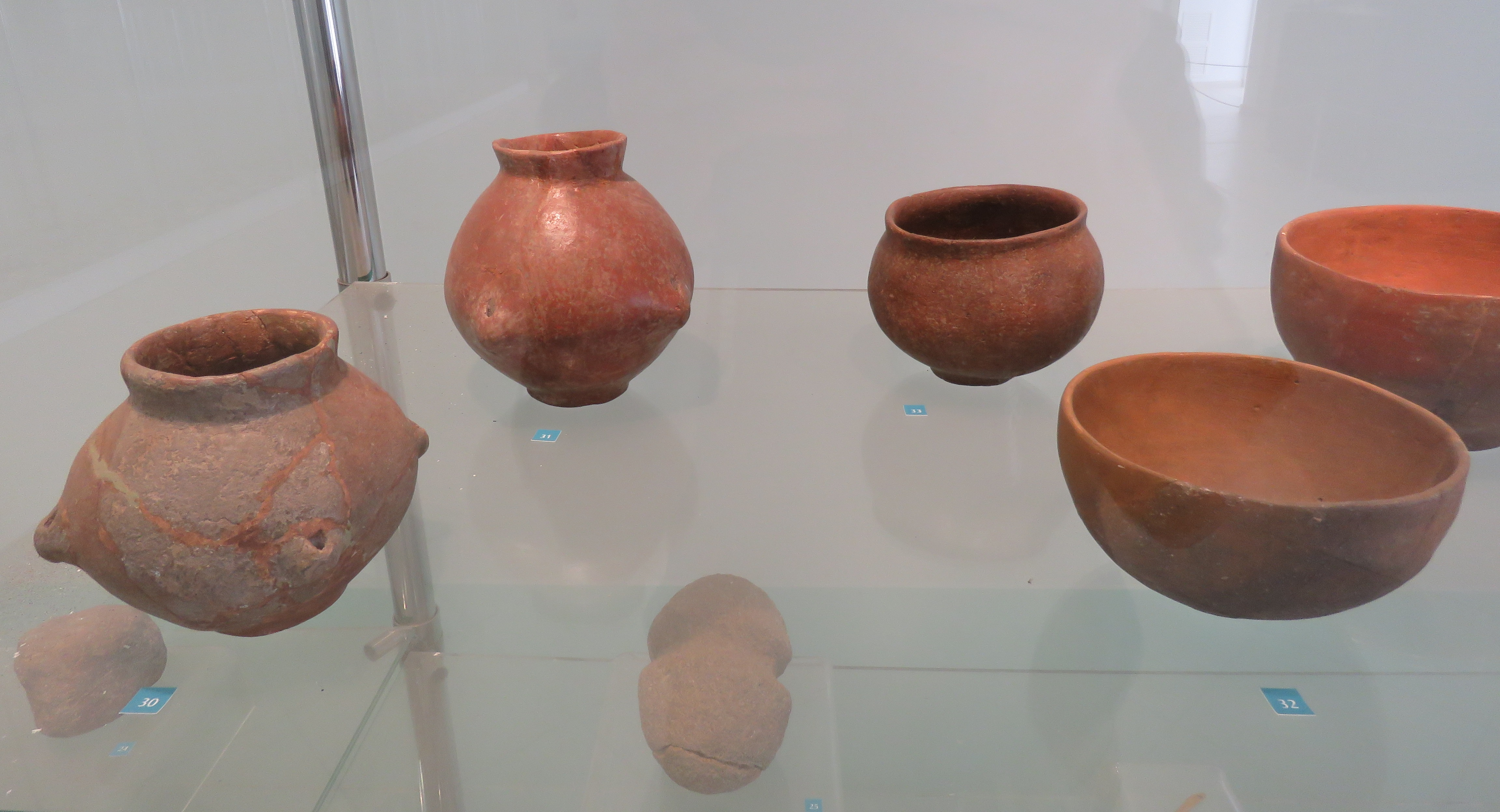

== See also ==
- Motala#Archaeogenetics
- Zvejnieki burial ground
- Deriivka
- Khvalynsk#Archaeogenetics
- Samara culture#Genetics
