= Deriivka =

Archaeological site in Ukraine

- Деріївка (Ukrainian); Дериевка (Russian)
- Location in Ukraine
- 48°54′53″N 33°46′52″E
- Cultures: Dnieper-Donets culture, Sredny Stog culture
- Region: Kirovohrad Oblast, Ukraine

History
- Built: ca. 4500 BC
- Abandoned: ca. 3500 BC

Deriivka (Ukrainian: Деріївка, Russian: Дериевка; the notoriously mistaken notation "Dereivka" was introduced by a translation of D.Ya. Telegin (1959) and all copiers) was an archaeological site located in the village of the same name in Kirovohrad Oblast, Ukraine, on the right bank of the Dnieper. The site dates to c. 4500—3500 BC and is associated with the Sredny Stog culture, now is under waters of artificial Kamianske Reservoir.

This site is known primarily as a probable site of early horse domestication due to a high percentage of horse bones found at the site. A horse burial with bit wear and cheek pieces was long considered evidence for horseback-riding at an early date, but in 1997 radiocarbon dates showed that the burial was intrusive, the horse having died circa 700-200 BC, thereby re-opening the question of when horseback-riding was invented.

Of interest is some apparently equivocal evidence for fenced houses. Two cemeteries are associated, one from the earlier (neolithic) Dnieper-Donets culture and one from the aforementioned Sredny Stog culture, of the Copper Age. The habitation site included three dwellings and six hearths, each containing hundreds of animal bones. Of all the bones, approximately 75% came from horses, possibly exploited by the inhabitants only as a food staple.

As a part of the Sredny Stog complex, it is considered to be very early Indo-European, and probably, Proto-Indo-European, within the traditional context of the Kurgan hypothesis of Marija Gimbutas, though Sredny Stog is itself pre-kurgan as to burial rite.

== Genetics ==
Mesolithic: Mathieson (2018) analyzed 28 individuals from Deriivka, dated to ca. 7000 BC to 2700 BC. As an example, one male, dated to ca. 7000 to 6700 BC, carried the paternal haplogroup R1a and the maternal U5a2a. Five individuals buried at the nearby site of Vasil'evka from ca. 8800 BC to 7500 BC were also analyzed. One male carried the paternal haplogroup R1a, another I2a1, the third R1b1a. With regard to mtDNA, all individuals surveyed, both male and female, carried subclades of maternal haplogroup U5.

Eighteen Neolithic individuals buried at Deriivka from ca. 5500 BC to 4500 BC were analyzed. Of the sixteen males analyzed, eleven were found to be carriers of R or various subclades of it (particularly R1b1a), while five carried I and subclades of it (I2a2a1b, I2a2a and I2a2a1b1). In regard to mtDNA, all Neolithic individuals, both male and female, belonged to U (particularly subclades of U5 and U4). Fifteen Neolithic individuals buried at the nearby sites of Volniensky, Vilnianka and Vovnigi from the 6500 BC to 4000 BC were also analyzed. Of the fourteen males analyzed, six carried I2a2 and various subclades of it, four carried I, one carried R1b1xM269, whilst the rest were lower coverage/ unresolved (R1*, I*, IJ*). In regard to mtDNA, all individuals except for a male who carried haplogroup T carried subclades of haplogroup U (U5, U4 and U2).

Four Eneolithic individuals buried at Deriivka from ca. 4000 BC to 2700 BC were analyzed. With regard to Y-DNA, the male studied carried R1b1a1a2a2. Regarding mtDNA, three individuals carried subclades of U5, while one female carried J2b1.

== See also ==
- Zvejnieki burial ground
- Iron Gates Mesolithic
- Domestication of the horse

== Sources ==
- J. P. Mallory, "Dereivka", Encyclopedia of Indo-European Culture, Fitzroy Dearborn, 1997.
- Mathieson, Iain (February 21, 2018). "The Genomic History of Southeastern Europe". Nature. 555 (7695). Nature Research: 197–203. Bibcode:2018Natur.555..197M. doi:10.1038/nature25778. PMC 6091220. PMID 29466330.
- Robert Drews, Early Riders. The Beginning of Mounted Warfare in Asia and Europe, Routledge Taylor & Francis Group, New York and London, 2004.
