= Pulli settlement =

Oldest known human settlement in Estonia

Coordinates: 58.4192°N 24.6756°E

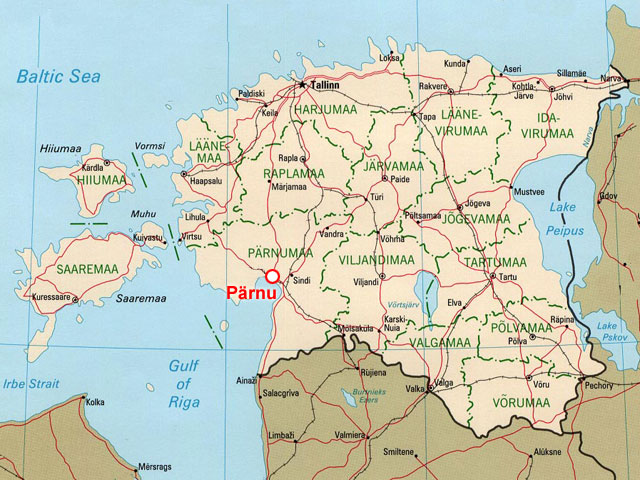
Location of Pulli (near Sindi) in Estonia

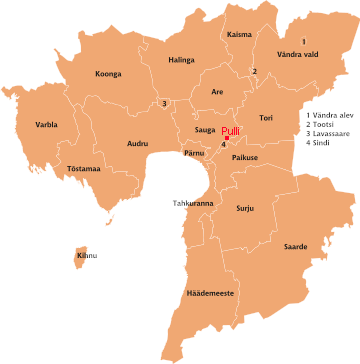
Location of Pulli in Pärnu County

Drone video of Pulli and the Pulli settlement

The Pulli settlement, located on the right bank of the Pärnu River, is the oldest known human settlement in Estonia. It is located near the present-day village of Pulli, two kilometers from the town of Sindi, which is 14 kilometers from Pärnu. According to radiocarbon dating, Pulli was settled around 11,000 years ago, at the beginning of the 9th millennium BC. A dog tooth found at the Pulli settlement is the first evidence for the existence of the domesticated dog in the territory of Estonia.

In all, 1,175 items used by people of the Mesolithic period were excavated at the Pulli settlement, among them tools mostly made of flint, especially arrowheads. A few items made of bone were also found, such as fishhooks and accessories made of animal claws.

In the Baltic area, the best sources of flint were in the south and southeast, in present-day Latvia and Lithuania and in Belarus. There are few natural sources of flint in the territory of Estonia. However, black flint of high quality from southern Lithuania and Belarus is identical with examples found at the Pulli settlement.

The people who lived at Pulli probably moved there from the south after the ice had melted, moving along the Daugava River in Latvia, then along the Latvian–Estonian coast of the Baltic Sea, and finally to the mouth of the Pärnu River. In 9000 BC, the Pulli settlement was located exactly where the Pärnu River then flowed into the Baltic Sea; today it is about 14 to 16 kilometers upstream from the sea.

Through almost the entire Stone Age, the Estonian area is clearly discernible as an original technocomplex, in which quartz dominates as the material for small tools produced by a splitting technique. The only exception is the Pulli site with its extensive use of imported flint.

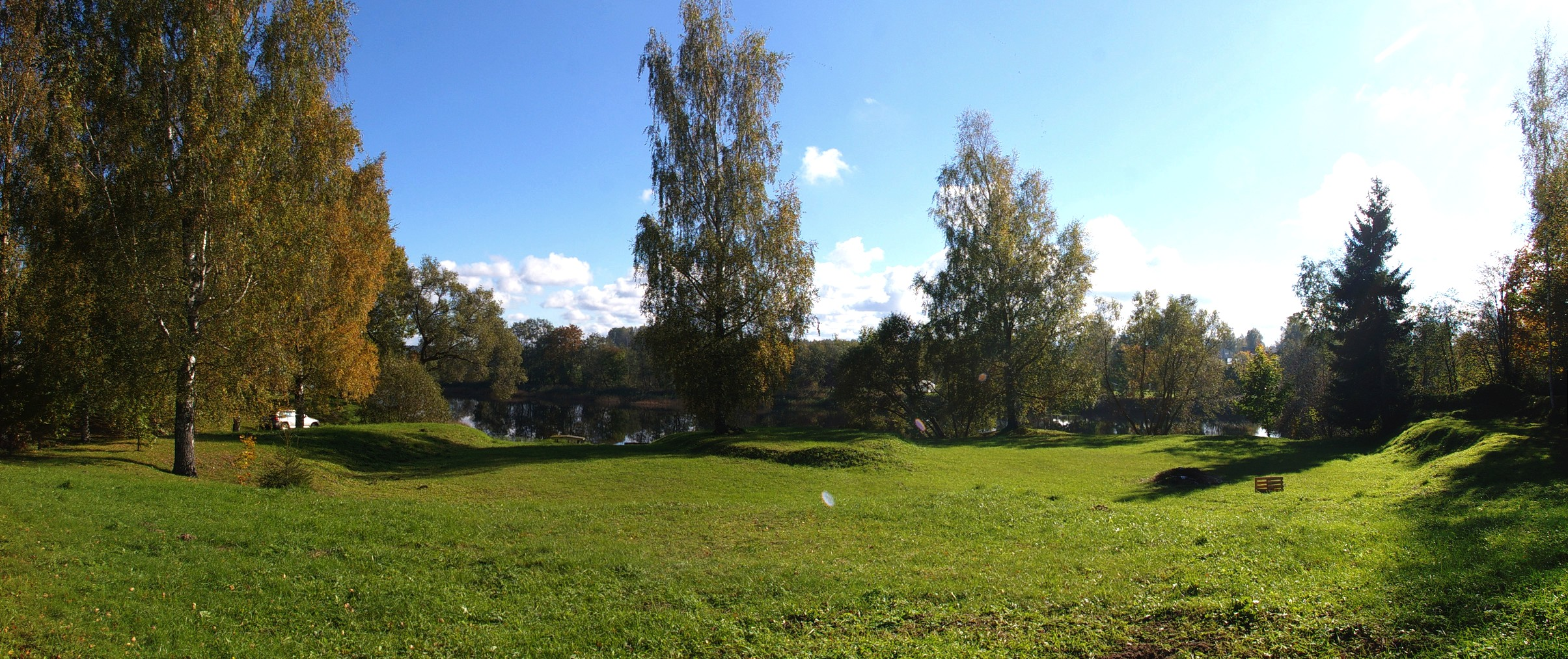
The Pulli settlement

The Pulli settlement was discovered in 1967 during excavation of sand from the right bank of the Pärnu River. Archaeological excavations were carried out from 1968 to 1973 and from 1975 to 1976 by the Estonian archaeologist Lembit Jaanits.

Three reliable carbon-14 dates come from the oldest known settlement site of Pulli, from the beginning of the Mesolithic: 9620 ± 120 (Hel-2206A), 9600 ± 120 (TA-245). and 9575 ± 115 (TA-176) 14C years (Raukas et al. 1995: 121). These belong, with a probability of 95.4%, to the period 9300 to 8600 cal. BC, which makes the average 8950 cal BC—considering the probability of 68.2%, an even 9,000 years cal BC. The Mesolithic archaeological complex in the eastern Baltic bears the common name of the Kunda culture.

Ancylus Lake around 8,700 years BP. The shrunken Scandinavian ice-cap is shown in white. Svea älv was a strait within the lake, and Göta älv formed an outlet to the Atlantic Ocean.

== Science ==
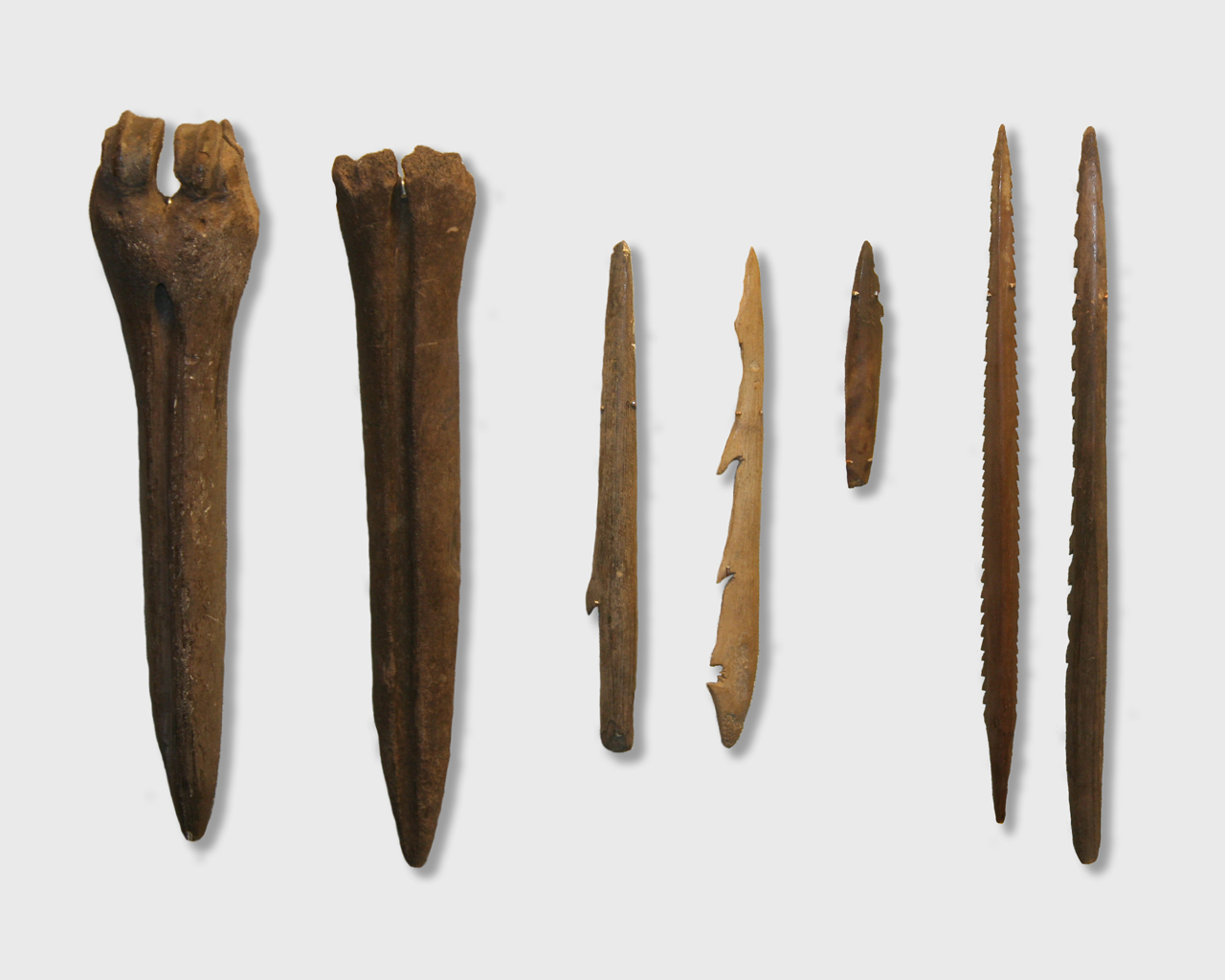
Tools of the Kunda culture

Studies were conducted on 16 sections of buried organic matter (pre-Ancylus Lake and pre-Littorina Sea) and associated Stone Age cultural layers in the Pärnu area of southwestern Estonia. Buried organic beds are each part of a sedimentary sequence that is repeated, forming two overlying sets of an orderly succession of five layers. The organic sedimentation of the lower set (set 1) occurred about 10,800 to 10,200 years BP, and that of the upper set (set 2) about 9450 to 7800 years BP. Associated with set 1 is the Early Mesolithic settlement of Pulli and with set 2 are the Stone Age cultural layers at Sindi-Lodja.

The Early and Middle Mesolithic sites in Estonia are concentrated on shores of rivers and lakes to use resources. The hunters and fishermen followed the ancient Pärnu River downstream to the receding shoreline of the Yoldia Sea. After about 10,700 years BP they were forced to retreat inland in front of the transgressive Ancylus Lake shore, which first inundated the Paikuse area about 10,400 years BP, and Pulli and higher sites about 10,200 years BP. The total amplitude of the transgression preceded 11 m and reached up to 14 m above sea level in the area. The Littorina Sea transgression reached 7 m above sea level after 8,000 to 7,800 years BP. The Mesolithic, Neolithic, and modern sites on top of each other in the Pärnu area may suggest that, although years apart, they were inhabited by the same group of people, who stayed in the area and moved back and forth together with the shifting shoreline of the Baltic Sea.

== See also ==
- Last glacial period (the most recent glacial period, which ended about 10,000 years ago)
- Epipaleolithic
- Kunda culture
- Prehistoric Europe
