= Swiderian culture =

Mesolithic culture in what is now Poland

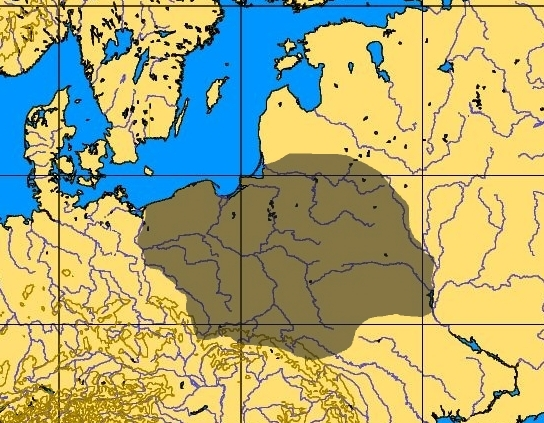
- Geographical range: Europe
- Period: Mesolithic Europe
- Dates: c. 11,000 – c. 8,200 BC
- Type site: Świdry Wielkie
- Major sites: Otwock
- Preceded by: Ahrensburg culture
- Followed by: Maglemosian culture, Kunda culture, Komornica culture

Map of Poland showing the location of Świdry Wielkie, the typesite of the Swiderian culture.

The Swiderian culture is an Upper Palaeolithic/Mesolithic cultural complex, centred on the area of modern Poland. The type-site is Świdry Wielkie, in Otwock near the Swider River, a tributary to the Vistula River, in Masovia. The Swiderian is recognized as a distinctive culture that developed on the sand dunes left behind by the retreating glaciers. Rimantienė (1996) considered the relationship between Swiderian and Solutrean "outstanding, though also indirect", in contrast with the Bromme-Ahrensburg complex (Lyngby culture), for which she introduced the term "Baltic Magdalenian" for generalizing all other North European Late Paleolithic culture groups that have a common origin in Aurignacian.

== Development ==
Three periods can be distinguished. The crude flint blades of Early Swiderian are found in the area of Nowy Mlyn in the Holy Cross Mountains region. The Developed Swiderian appeared with their migrations to the north and is characterized by tanged blades: this stage separates the northwestern European cultural province, embracing Belgium, Holland, northwest Germany, Denmark and Norway, and the Middle East European cultural province, embracing Silesia, Brandenburgia, Poland, Lithuania, Belarus, Western Russia, Ukraine and the Crimea. Late Swiderian is characterized by blades with a blunted back.

The Swiderian culture plays a central role in the Palaeolithic-Mesolithic transition. It has been generally accepted that most of the Swiderian population emigrated at the very end of the Pleistocene (10,000 BP uncalibrated; 9500 BC calibrated) to the northeast following the retreating tundra, after the Younger Dryas.

Swiderian archaeological sites in the eastern Carpathians (such as at Scaune at 1328 m altitude in the Ceahlău massif in Romania) indicate that some groups of Swiderian hunters (with their typically pedunculated stone arrowheads) gradually retreated to relatively colder hunting grounds in montane areas in addition to their well-known gradual northern retreat.

Recent radiocarbon dates prove that some groups of the Svidero-Ahrensburgian Complex persisted into the Preboreal. Unlike western Europe, the Mesolithic groups now inhabiting the Polish Plain were newcomers. This has been attested by a 300-year-long gap between the youngest Palaeolithic and the oldest Mesolithic occupation. The oldest Mesolithic site is Chwalim, located in western Silesia, Poland; it outdates the Mesolithic sites situated to the east in central and northeastern Poland by about 150 years. Thus, the Mesolithic population progressed from the west after a 300-year-long settlement break, and moved gradually towards the east. The lack of good flint raw materials in the Polish early Mesolithic has been interpreted thus that the new arriving people were not acquainted yet with the best local sources of flint, proving their external origin.

== Impact ==
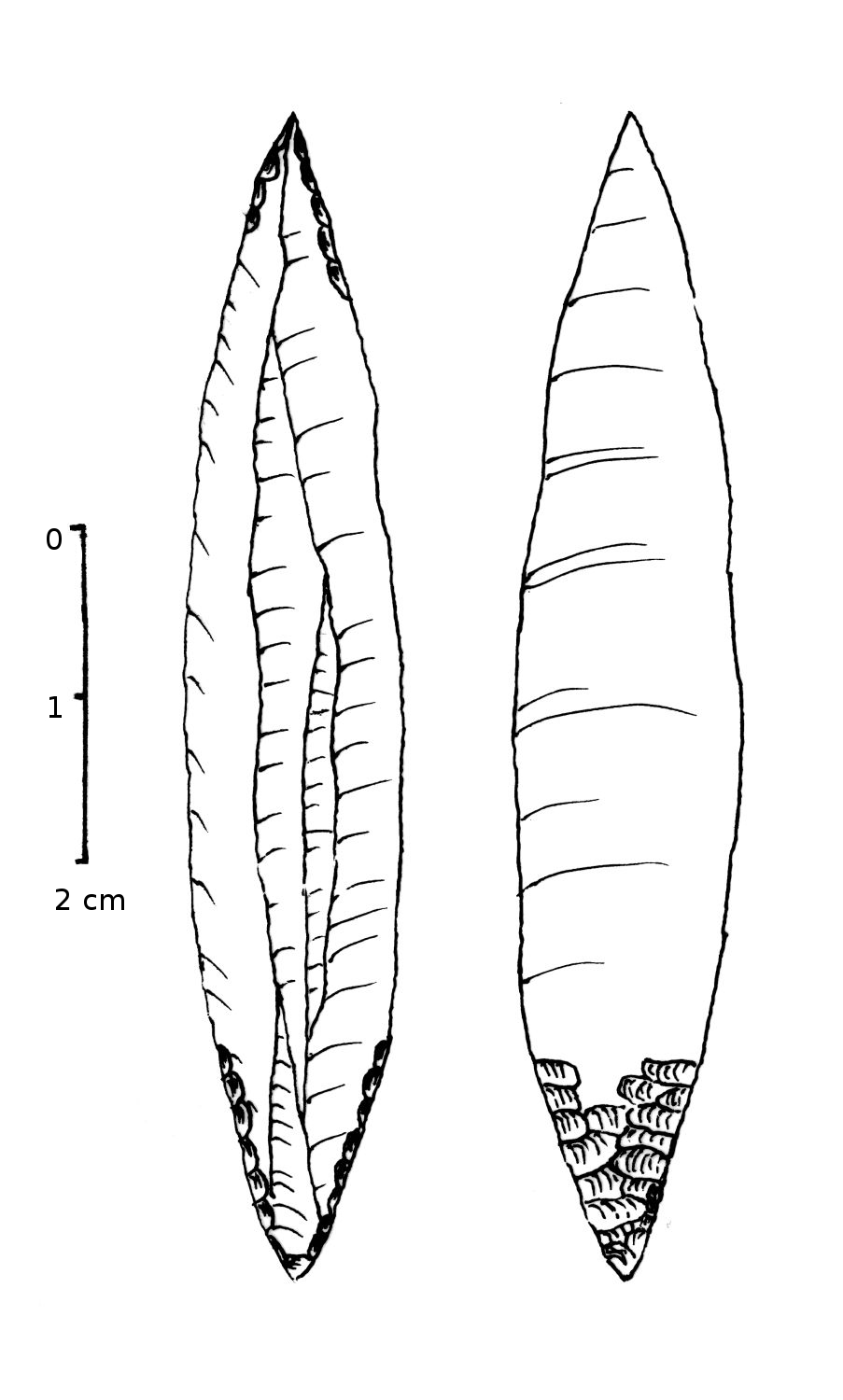
Swiderian willow-leaf point

The Ukrainian archaeologist L. Zalizniak (1989, p. 83-84) believes Kunda culture of Central Russia and the Baltic zone, and other so-called post-Swiderian cultures, derive from the Swiderian culture. Sorokin (2004) rejects the "contact" hypothesis of the formation of Kunda culture and holds it originated from the seasonal migrations of Swiderian people at the turn of Pleistocene and Holocene when human subsistence was based on hunting reindeer. Many of the earliest Mesolithic sites in Finland are post-Swiderian; these include the Ristola site in Lahti and the Saarenoja 2 site in Joutseno with lithics in imported flint, as well as the Sujala site in Utsjoki in the province of Lapland. The raw materials of the lithic assemblage at Sujala originate in the Varanger Peninsula in northern Norway. Concerning this region, the commonly held view today is that the earliest settlement of the North Norwegian coast originated in the Fosna culture of the western and southwestern coast of Norway and ultimately in the final Palaeolithic Ahrensburg culture of northwestern Europe. The combination of a coastal raw material and a lithic technique typical to Late Palaeolithic and very early Mesolithic industries of northern Europe, originally suggested that Sujala was contemporaneous to Phase 1 of the Norwegian Finnmark Mesolithic (Komsa proper), dating to between 9 000 and 10 000 BP. Proposed parallels with the blade technology among the earliest Mesolithic finds in southern Norway would have placed the find closer or even before 10 000 BP. However, a preliminary connection to early North Norwegian settlements is contradicted by the shape of the tanged points and by the blade reduction technology from Sujala. The bifacially shaped tang and ventral retouch on the tip of the arrowpoints and the pressure technique used in blade manufacture are rare or absent in Ahrensburgian contexts, but very characteristic of the so-called Post-Swiderian cultures of Western Russia. There, counterparts of the Sujala cores can also be found. The Sujala assemblage is currently considered unquestionably post-Swiderian and is dated by radiocarbon to 9265-8930 BP, corresponding to 8300-8200 calBC. Such an Early Mesolithic influence from Russia or the Baltic might imply an adjustment to previous thoughts on the colonization of the Barents Sea coast.

== See also ==
- Ahrensburg culture
