= Trescovăț =

Mountain in Romania

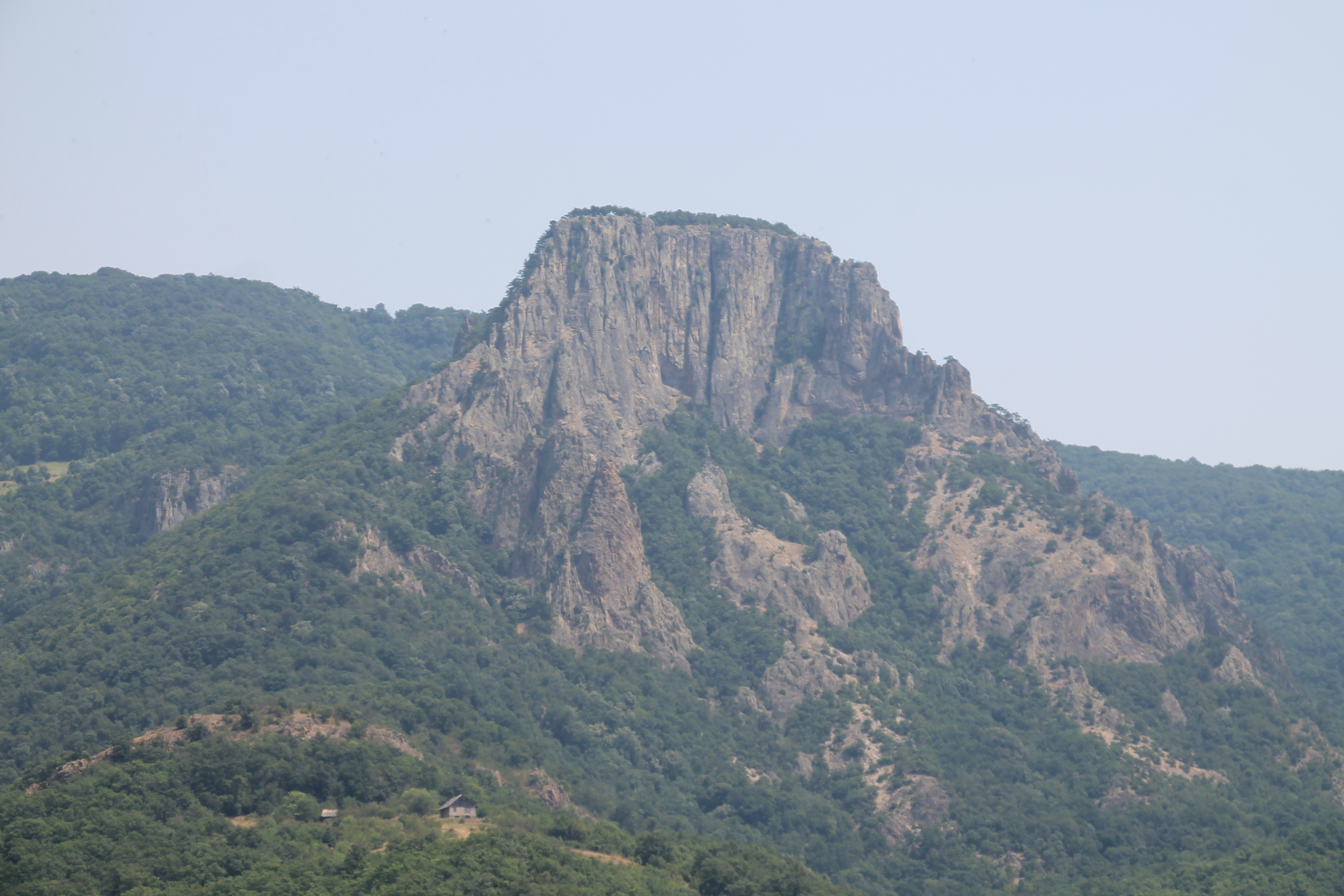
- The distinctive Trescovăț peak seen from Lepenski Vir on the opposite side of the Danube

Highest point
- Elevation: 679 m (2,228 ft)
- Coordinates: 44°33′51″N 22°03′22″E

Geography
- Location within Romania
- Location: Southwestern Romania

Trescovăț (Romanian: Vârful Trescovăț; Serbian: Трескавац / Treskavac) is a peak in Romania with an elevation of 679 m (2,228 ft). Located in the Iron Gates on the left bank of the Danube river, it may have been important to the prehistoric site of Lepenski Vir located on the opposite Serbian river bank.

== Geology ==
Trescovăț is a Lower Permian porphyry bare volcanic neck in the Iron Gates Natural Park. The peak, well visible from both shores of the Danube, is categorized as a geosite due to its geomorphological feature and trapezoidal shape.

== Archaeoastronomy ==
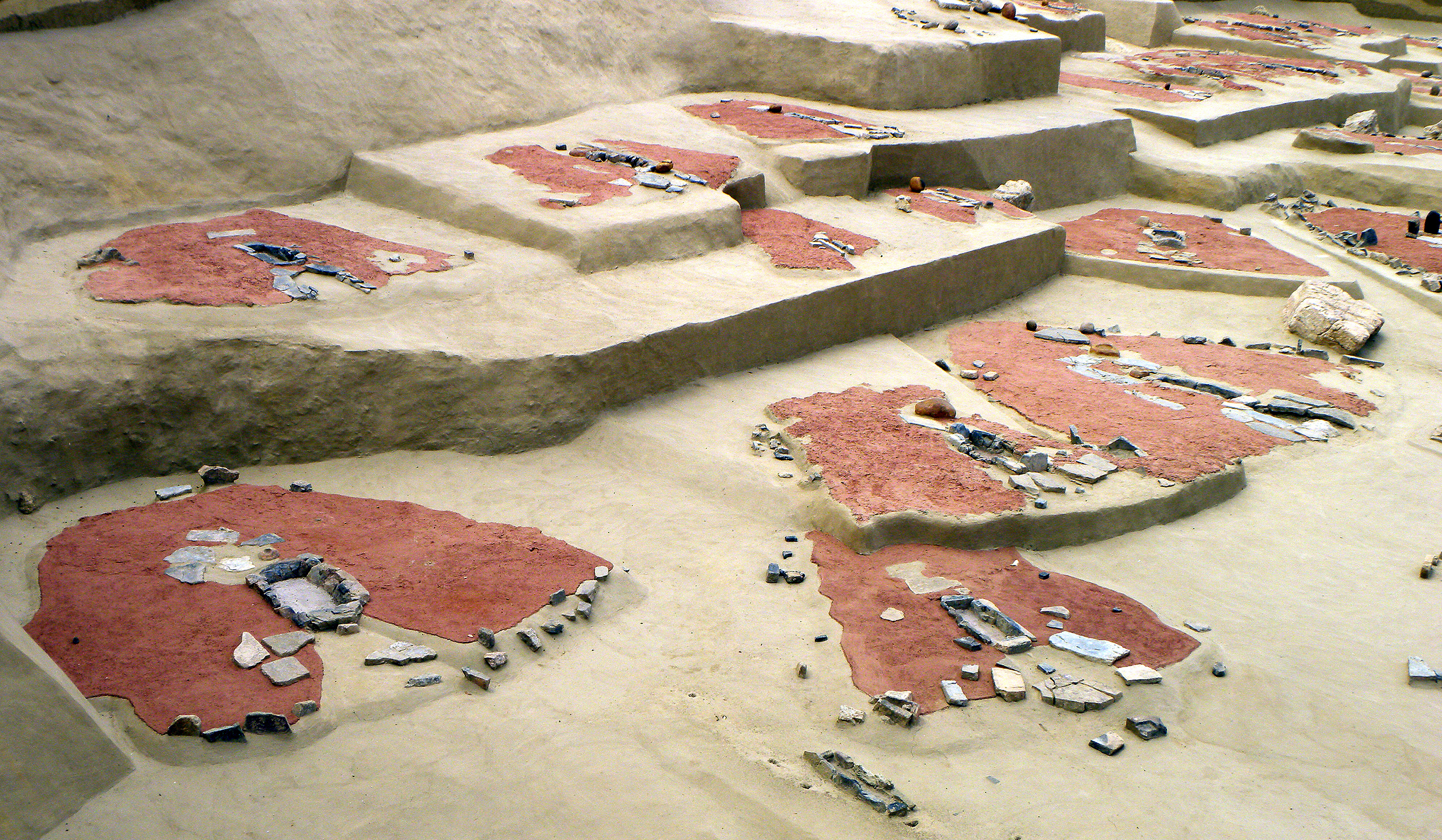
Trapezoidal shape of Lepenski Vir houses

Trescovăț rises on the left bank of the Danube like a giant rock sentinel of the prehistoric site of Lepenski Vir on the opposite right bank. The peculiar trapezoidal shape of the Mesolithic Lepenski Vir houses are mimicking the monumental rock.

Based on archaeoastronomical surveys, scholars concluded, that the Mesolithic Lepenians used a solar calendar and that the place was planned according to this phenomenon even determining the shape of their houses. The starting point of their calendar was therefore the "double sunrise" i.e. the Sun appears above Trescovăț, then goes behind its outcropping and reappears again. From that day, the Lepenians observed how the dawn point shifts to the right and shortens the day, until the winter solstice. Others claimed that Lepenski Vir was an ancient Sun and Pleiades constellation observatory with Trescovăț as a natural marker.
