= Lepenski Vir =

Archaeological site in Serbia

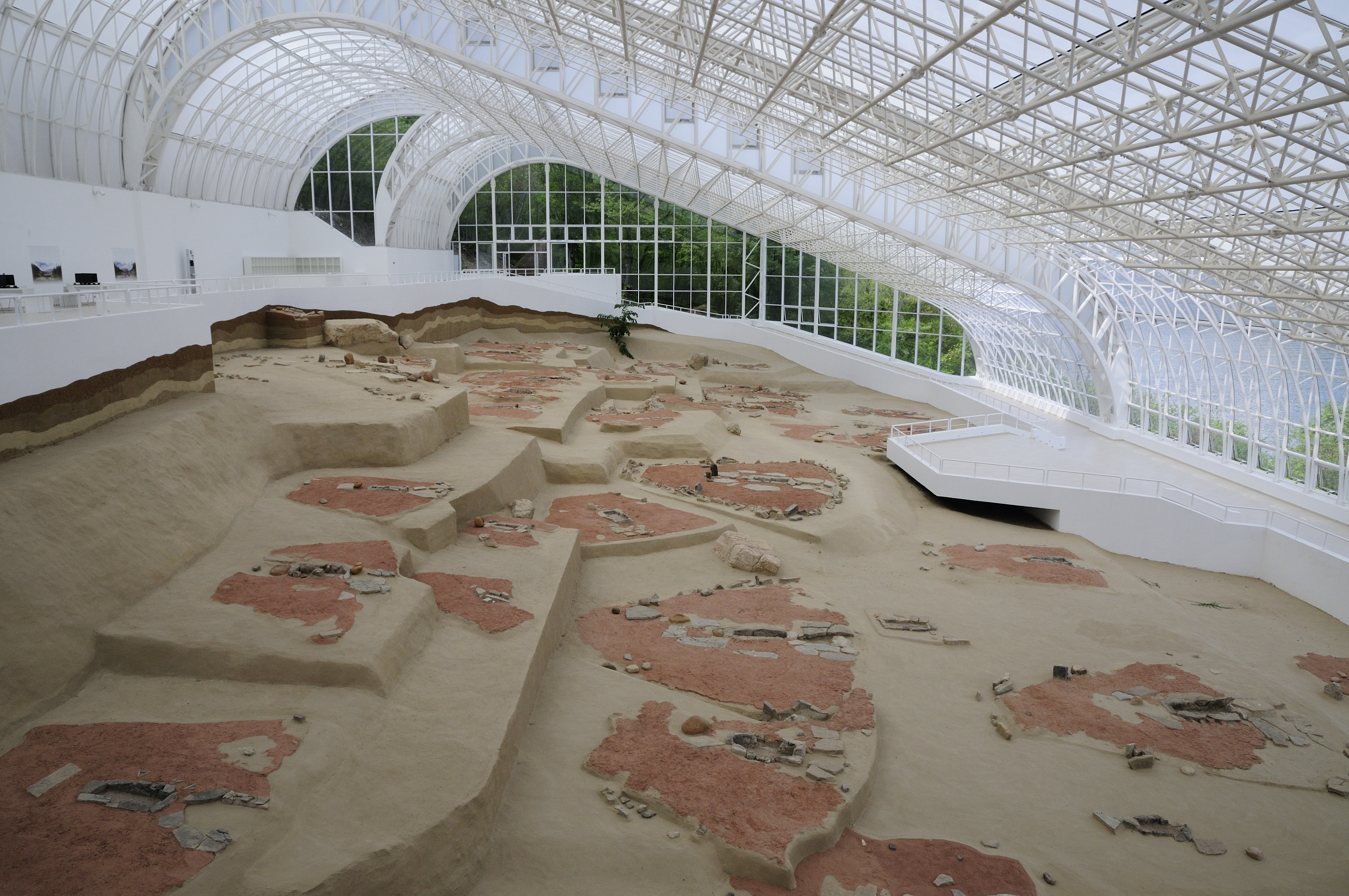
- Lepenski Vir site - scaled size display under glass roof

- Location within Serbia
- 44°33′40″N 22°01′27″E
- Type: Settlement
- Location: Serbia

Site notes
- Condition: In ruins

Cultural Heritage of Serbia
- Type: Archeological Site of Exceptional Importance
- Designated: 26 May 1966; 60 years ago
- Reference no.: AN 45

Lepenski Vir (Serbian Cyrillic: Лепенски Вир, "Lepena Whirlpool"), located in Serbia, is an important archaeological site of the Lepenski Vir culture (also called as Lepenski Vir-Schela Cladovei culture). It includes Mesolithic Iron Gates Hunter-Gatherers period and transition to Early Neolithic Early European Farmers period of Southeastern Europe.

The latest radiocarbon and AMS data suggests that the chronology of Lepenski Vir spans between 9500/7200 and 5500 BC, divided into Early–Middle Mesolithic, Late Mesolithic, Transition and Neolithic. There is some disagreement about when the settlement and culture of Lepenski Vir began, but the latest data indicates that it was between 9500 and 7200 BC. The late Lepenski Vir (6300–6000 BC) architectural phase saw the development of unique trapezoidal buildings and monumental sculpture, related with the admixing of Iron Gates Hunter-Gatherers with newly arrived Early European Farmers. The Lepenski Vir site consists of one large settlement with around ten satellite villages. Numerous piscine (fish) sculptures with human-like faces and peculiar architectural remains have been found at the site.

Archaeologist Dragoslav Srejović, who first explored the site, said that such large sculptures so early in human history, and the original architectural solutions, define Lepenski Vir as a specific and very early phase in the development of European prehistoric culture. The site was notable for its outstanding level of preservation and the overall exceptional quality of its artifacts. Because the settlement was permanent and planned, with an organized societal life, architect Hristivoje Pavlović labeled Lepenski Vir as "the first city in Europe".

The Đerdap National Park, which includes Lepenski Vir, was established in 1974. On 10 July 2020, the park's wider area was designated a UNESCO global geopark. Apart from the Iron Gates gorge, the Đerdap UNESCO Global Geopark includes parts of the Miroč and Kučaj mountain massifs, with total area of 1,330 km^{2} (510 sq mi), and was the first such designation in Serbia.

== Location and geography ==
Lepenski Vir is located on the right bank of the Danube in eastern Serbia, within the Iron Gates gorge. It is situated in the village of Boljetin, near Donji Milanovac. The view above and across the Danube is wide open and the stable and enduring terrain on the river's bank resists the intensely erosive effects of the Danube. Stability is secured by two or three boulders at the top of the plaz, a rocky cape jutting deeply into the river. The boulders acted as a natural anchor for the terrain on which the settlement developed. Long habitation on the site was also enabled by the proximity of the great river, the natural richness of the hinterland, and the thermic benefits of the accumulated limestone cliffs (considering the ice age which had just ended). Additionally, long-term habitation was facilitated by the presumed knowledge of some birth control practices, given the limited area on which the settlement could grow, even though it is believed that parts of the settlement remain undiscovered.

Whirlpools were created by the protruding rocks, and the swirling waters are more oxygenated, richer in algae and thus abundant in fish. The whirling current makes fishing easier than in the waters which rush through the gorge. Also, the swirling water actually deposited materials on the downstream side of the plaz, known today as Katarinine Livadice, making it stronger and more stable instead of allowing the fast and strong river current to erode it. In the immediate hinterland, there is a slope known as Košo Brdo. Embedded into it is the natural stone niche or rock shelter (abij), called Lepenska Potkapina, which was explored by archaeologist Branko Gavela.

Downstream from Lepenski Vir, in the direction of Vlasac, and half-way to the mouth of the small Boljetinka or Lepena river, the vertical 40 m (130 ft) high Lepena Rock rises over the river. At the foot of the rock, the Romans built a road that is today submerged at a depth of 13.5 m (44 ft) under the waters of Lake Đerdap, together with a road plaque commemorating Emperor Tiberius. The slope above the Danube between the Lepena Rock and the mouth of the Lepena river is also called Lepena, as is the bight where the slope ends.

== Discovery ==
The site was discovered on 30 August 1960, on a lot owned by a local farmer, Manojlo Milošević.

Subsequently, after almost three years of inactivity, archaeological exploration of the region was organized by the Belgrade Institute for Archaeology. Construction of the Iron Gate I Hydroelectric Power Station, which would flood the bank regions with its artificial lake, was slated to begin, so archaeologists wanted to explore the area as much as possible before that happened. The head of the project at the time was Dušanka Vučković-Todorović, a fellow at the institute. The area to be investigated was between the villages of Prahovo and Golubac. Archaeologist Obrad Kujović explored the Lepenski Vir section with his assistant Ivica Kostić, following the work of previous visitors and archaeologists such as Felix Philipp Kanitz and Nikola Vulić. The location appeared ideal for a settlement, so Kujović and Kostić surveyed it. They found many ceramic fragments that it was like uncovering a ceramics workshop. Kujović recognized it as an important archaeological site, collected fragments, dated them as being part of the Starčevo culture and made a report for the institute. Srejović, intrigued by the findings, contacted Kujović in 1961 for detailed information.

== Excavations ==
Srejović managed to acquire the necessary funding and on 6 August 1965 began exploration of the site with Zagorka Letica, which continued with excavations through 1966 and 1967. Probing of the terrain in 1965 grew into protective excavations in 1966 and developed into fully systematic excavations in 1967 as they dug deeper. The cultural-archaeological layer starts below the surface layer of humus, 50 cm (20 in) thick.

It was only in 1967, after the discovery of the first Mesolithic sculptures, that the site's importance was fully understood. These findings were publicly announced on 16 August 1967. The excavations ended in 1971 when the whole site was relocated 29.7 m (97 ft) higher to avoid flooding from the newly formed Đerdap Lake, created by the construction of the Iron Gate I Hydroelectric Power Station. The main exploration of this site was the work of professor Dragoslav Srejović of the University of Belgrade. Exploring up to the depth of 3.5 m (11 ft), 136 or 138 buildings, settlements and altars were found in the initial excavations in 1965–1970. A necropolis was discovered in 1968.

== History ==
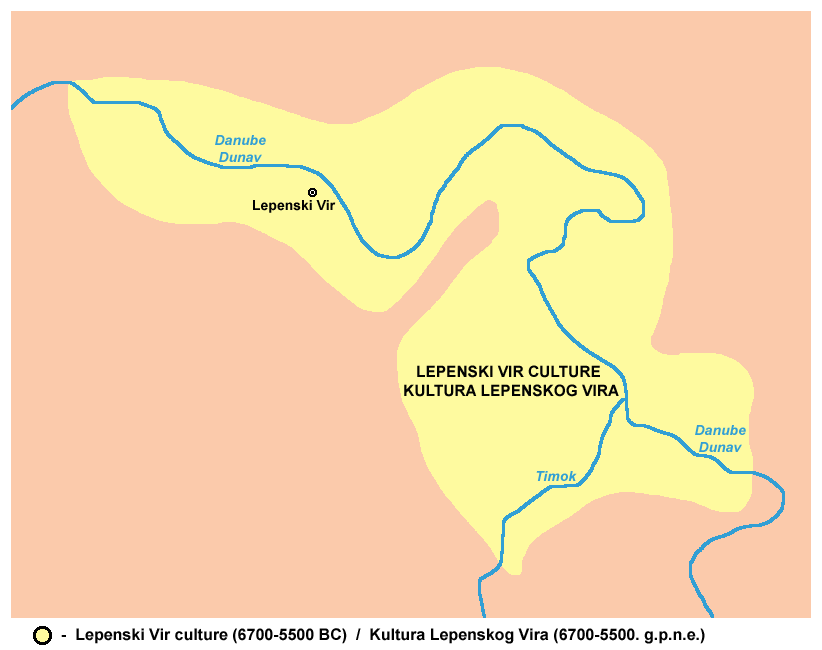
Area of Lepenski Vir culture

The main site comprises several archeological phases starting with Proto-Lepenski Vir, then Lepenski Vir Ia through Ie, Lepenski Vir II and Lepenski Vir III, whose occupation spanned 1,500 to 2,000 years, from the Mesolithic to the Neolithic period, when it was succeeded by the Neolithic Vinča culture and Starčevo culture, both upstream the Danube, 135 km (84 mi) and 139 km (86 mi) from Lepenski Vir, respectively. A number of satellite villages belonging to the same culture and time period were discovered in the surrounding area. These additional sites include Hajdučka Vodenica, Padina, Vlasac, Ikaona, Kladovska Skela, and others. Found artifacts include tools made from stone and bone, the remains of houses, and numerous sacral objects including unique piscine (fish) with human-like face stone sculptures.

It is assumed that the people of Lepenski Vir culture represent the descendants of the early European population of the Brno-Předmostí (Czech Republic) hunter gatherer culture from the end of the last ice age. Archeological evidence of human habitation of the surrounding caves dates back to around 20,000 BC. The first settlement on the low plateau dates back to 9500–7200 BC, a time when the climate became significantly warmer.

Trescovăț, a bare porphyritic cliff (679 m (2,228 ft) high) rises on the left bank of the Danube opposite Lepenski Vir like a giant sentinel of the prehistoric settlement. Trescovăț may have been important to the inhabitants of Lepenski Vir as a solar observatory. The development of the settlement was strongly influenced by the topology of the surrounding area. It sat on a narrow promontory on the bank of the river, hemmed between cliffs and the flow of the Danube. As such it offered only limited resources in terms of food, raw materials and living space. This is reflected in the findings from the earliest layer. Proto-Lepenski Vir represents only a small settlement of perhaps four or five families with a population of less than one hundred. The primary food source of the inhabitants was probably fishing. Fishing communities of this type are typical for the wider Danube valley region during this period.

In later periods, the problems of overpopulation of the settlement became evident and led to important sociological changes.

Archaeological findings in the surrounding area show evidence of temporary settlements, probably built for the purpose of hunting and gathering of food or raw materials. This suggests a complex semi-nomadic economy with managed exploitation of resources in the area not immediately surrounding the village, something remarkable in terms of the traditional view of Mesolithic people of Europe. More complexity in an economy leads to occupational specialization and thus to social differentiation.

These developments are clearly evident in the layout of the Lepenski Vir I-a through I-e settlement. The village was well planned. All houses were built according to a single complex geometric pattern. The remains of these houses constitute the distinct Lepenski Vir architecture. The main layout of the village is clearly visible. The dead were buried outside the village in an elaborate cemetery. The only exceptions were apparently a few notable elders who were buried behind the fireplaces (hearths) of houses.

The complex social structure was dominated by a religion which probably served as a binding force for the community and a means of coordination of activity for its members. Numerous sacral objects that were discovered in this layer support this theory. The most remarkable examples are piscine sculptures, unique to the Lepenski Vir culture, which represent one of the first examples of monumental sacral art on European soil.

Lepenski Vir gives us a rare opportunity to observe the gradual transition from the hunter-gatherer lifeways of early humans to the agricultural economy of the Neolithic. An increasingly complex social structure influenced the development of the planning and self-discipline necessary for agricultural production.

Once agricultural products became a commodity, a new way of life replaced the old social structure. Distinct characteristics of Lepenski Vir culture, such as its house architecture and piscine sculptures, gradually disappeared. Lepenski Vir III is representative of a Neolithic site and is more typical of other comparable sites across a much wider area. The exact mechanism of this transition remains unclear, but the evidence suggests development through evolution rather than invasion from without.

=== Archaeogenetics ===
A group of 80 institutes and 117 researchers, including archaeologists Andrej Starović and Dušan Borić from Serbia, published the results of their archaeogenetic-genomic research in Nature magazine in February 2018 (as Mathieson et al.). Genomes of 235 ancient inhabitants were studied. In terms of the area surrounding Lepenski Vir (localities of Starčevo, Saraorci-Jezava, Lepenski Vir, Padina, and Vlasac), it was established that the region's original population, the Hunter-Gatherers, inhabited the area for an extended time. Then, starting from c.7500 BC, a new population began to settle the Balkans and the Danube valley. Evidence shows that these Neolithic newcomers mixed with the indigenous population in Lepenski Vir. Arriving from Asia Minor, the Early European Farmers had a completely different lifestyle. They brought the first grain crops, knowledge of agriculture, and the husbandry of sheep, cattle, and goats. Based on their research, Starović concluded that the blending of the populations occurred almost immediately, during the first immigrant generation, which was unique, as in other parts of Europe two such different communities would initially live in proximity to each other. He believes that this melting pot was a keystone of human development in Europe. It produced the burgeoning of the Lepenski Vir culture, establishing the Balkan Neolithic, the most original occurrence in the entire prehistory in Europe. This was the foundation of the concepts of village, (village) square, family - which then took hold across the continent. The modern Serbian population still incorporates some 10% of their genes from this original mix.

In Mathieson et al. (2018) were analysed a male and three females from Lepenski Vir dated to 6000-5700 BC, the male carried Y-DNA haplogroup haplogroup R1b1a, while mtDNA haplogroups were HV, H13, H40, and J2b1. In a two-way autosomal DNA admixture model, two were Early European Farmers (with isotope analysis showing that they were migrants that did not grow up at Lepenski Vir), one of mixed Western Hunter-Gatherer-EEF and one of WHG-ancestry. Marchi et al. (2022) analysed two males samples, they had Y-DNA haplogroup C1a2b and G2a2b2a1a1c with mtDNA haplogroups K1a1 and H3v. Brami et al. (2022) re-examined and reviewed many male and female samples from the Lepenski Vir culture including from Hofmanová et al. (2017–2022), finding also Y-DNA haplogroups C2c and I2, but mtDNA haplogroups were initially predominantly U5 and H but with Neolithic transition (~ 5900 BC) prevalent became mtDNA lineages J, X, T, N1a. Autosomally it is concluded that the "individuals from the Mesolithic or Proto-Lepenski Vir phase (~ 9500–7400 BC) at the eponymous site of Lepenski Vir are well modelled as 100% Iron Gates HGs, without Aegean ancestry, which arrives only after 6200 BC", and since then were admixed or 100% of Aegean-Early European Farmer ancestry.

== Localities ==
There are about 25 separate localities − including the central settlement and its satellite villages − in the Lepenski Vir-Kladovska Skela region. They were explored up until the 1980s, when the river valley was flooded after the construction of the Iron Gate I and Iron Gate II Hydroelectric Power Stations:

- Kula - located in the village of Mihajlovac. It was explored by archaeologist Miodrag Sladić in the 1980s, before it was flooded by Lake Đerdap II. It is a Meso-Neolithic locality, consisting of three natural layers: Kula I, Kula II (with sub-layers of II-a and II-b) and Kula III. According to the archaeologist Ivana Radovanović, Kula II is a contemporary of Lepenski Vir I and the houses at both locations are identical. The trapezoid foundations of the houses in Kula II are buried under great quantities of collapsed wall plaster.
- Lepenski Vir or simply Vir, is much more complex. It consists of four layers (Proto-Lepenski Vir, Vir I, II and III) and seven sub-layers (I-a, b, c, d, e and III-a, b). The sub-layers of Vir I are not fully and clearly differentiated. In most cases they are not separate development strata, but are defined to make an easier visual overview because the periods of intensive construction, adaptation, renovation and iterations of the settlement overlap through the layers. Vir III is the youngest layer of Lepenski Vir, belonging to the Neolithic Starčevo culture. The intermediate layer Vir II is Mesolithic, and "not fully sterile", pointing to the continuity and longevity of constant settlement in Lepenski Vir. The youngest layers of Vir III were damaged when the foundations for the much later Roman watchtower were dug.

Based on an amount of anthropological changes in the skeletons, a microevolution was attested, as Srejović estimated that at least 120 generations lived in the settlement (2,000 years) while Hungarian anthropologist János Nemeskéri estimated that during the entire human habitation in Lepenski Vir, there were 240 to 280 generations, or almost 5,000 years of continual habitation. They made the distinction between the Lepenski Vir culture (1,500–2,000 years) and simple occupation of the same habitat (5,000 years).

== Architecture ==
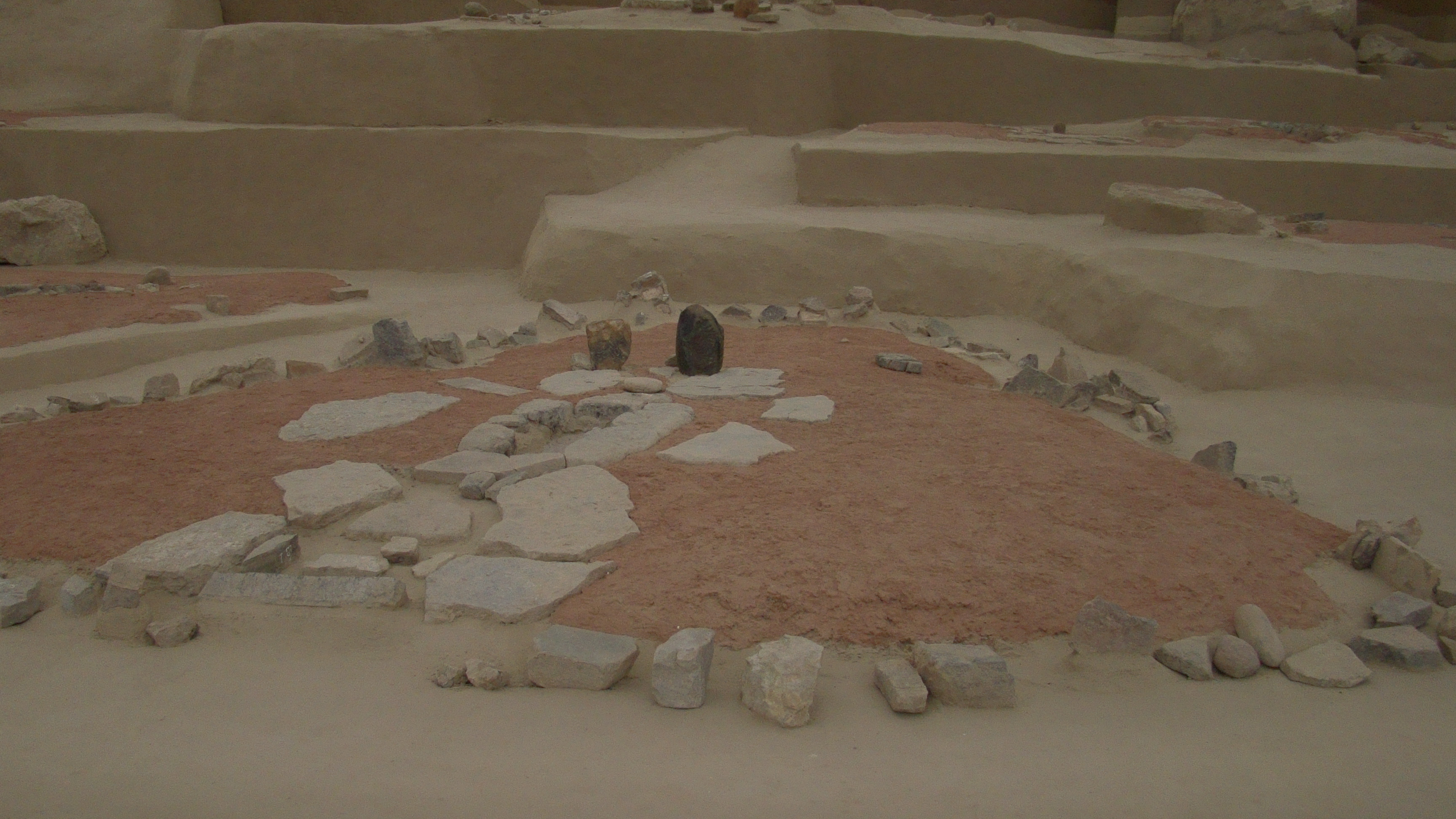

Seven successive settlements were discovered on the Lepenski Vir site, with the remains of 136 residential and sacral buildings dating from 9500/7200 BC to 6000 BC.

The layout of the houses, which are on an inclined promontory that opens to the river, is terrace-like and spread in a fan-shaped arrangement, allowing access to the river by people from houses further from the bank. As for the tools used for the construction works, not many have survived, or the ones that have are not recognized as such. Apart from the human instinct for best use of space and for a "pleasing to the eye" sense in architecture, it is quite possible that Lepenians possessed certain forms of knowledge in this area that we would not usually attribute to or expect from people of that era. Such knowledge may have atrophied over time as their society didn't survive and left no written documents. Mostly burned deer antlers were discovered, but it is believed that, in order to render the trapezoid shape of both the plateau and the houses they must have used sticks, tightening of ropes, vertical rods, etc., or natural features, such as shadows.

=== Houses ===
The history of architecture still provides no definite answer as to which is older: the house (as a habitat) or the temple (as a shrine). In Lepenski Vir, it appears that there was a process of gradual desacralization, meaning that the shrines were converted into houses over time. The houses from the Vir I period are marked with Arabic numerals, while those from the Vir II with Roman numerals. For example, houses 61 and 65, from Vir I were superimposed by houses XXXIV and XXXV, from Vir II.

All the settlements follow the shape of the underlying terrain, a horseshoe-shaped area of land. Settlements always face in the direction of the river, which was the obvious focus of life for its inhabitants. The basic layout of the settlement consists of two separate wings and a wide empty central space which served as a village square or meeting place. The settlement is radially divided with numerous pathways leading to the edge of the river. The outer edges of the village are parallel to the surrounding cliffs.

Domestic objects mark the transition from tent structure to house. All the houses share a very distinct shape, built according to a complex geometric pattern. The basis of each of the houses is a circle segment of exactly 60 degrees, constructed in the manner of an equilateral triangle. The tip of the trapezoid base, a shape previously unknown in human settlements, faces into the wind (košava). The shape of the house base is original and not recorded in any other locality. The material used for the floors is the local limestone clay, which, when mixed with animal dung and ash, hardens like concrete. As a result, the floors are in almost perfect condition. On the edges of the floors there are remnants of the stone reinforcements which served as supports for the upper construction elements, indicating that the houses were covered. The roofing material was some easily degradable material or was similar to the surrounding loess, making it indistinguishable from the loess found during the excavations. The plaster, a reddish muddy clay, is still abundant in the region. In the village of Boljetin there are still several houses plastered with it. The material is called lep, hence the name of the locality, Lepenski Vir, or literally "red clay whirlpool". Even today, brandy-producing cauldrons, called lepenac, are still being used. They are made of wood, but plastered with the red loam, which is also used by the local swallows to harden their nests. As for the structures which covered the houses, their appearance is not known. They may have resembled the modern brandy cauldron − wood covered with red clay − or they have used wattle instead of proper wood.

According to Srejović, the planned design of the settlement, with its functionality and proportionality, shows an almost modern architectural sense. Despite the millennia which separate then from now, the architectural plan of the settlement seems contemporary and fully recognizable to us today, while architect Bogdan Bogdanović has said that "everything, absolutely everything, to the smallest detail" about the Lepenski Vir, has enormous importance.

The houses are completely standardized in design, but vary widely in size. The smallest of the houses have an area of 1.5 m^{2} (16 sq ft) while the largest one covers 30 m^{2} (320 sq ft).

Pit-houses appear in the early periods Vir III-a and III-b, which already corresponds to the Starčevo culture, though some can also be found in the oldest period, Proto-Vir. By digging to the level of the frost line, which is in this area no more than 80 cm (31 in) deep, the natural, constant temperature of the ground can be utilized. The walls of the dugout were plastered with mud which was then dried and hardened with fire. The clay was hardened to such an extent that architect Radmilo Petrović managed to remove the complete clay coverings intact, like giant clay bowls out of their mold.

Another reason for digging the houses into the ground is the inclination of the terrain on which they were built, which is 11 degrees. In other localities, the conditions were different. At Vlasac, for example, the natural, funnel-shaped gullies were adapted into the houses.

==== House 49 ====
House 49 is the smallest of all, and considered to be the most intriguing. The majority of researchers believe that this house was the prototype for the entire settlement. The hearth in this house is also the smallest, no larger than a shoe. Still, evidence shows that it was used for fire.

==== House XLIV ====
The 30 m^{2} (320 sq ft) large house 57, from the Vir I-e period, is overlaid with house XLIV from the Vir II, which covers 42 m^{2} (450 sq ft), making it the largest discovered house. It was obviously very important for the settlement, not just because of its size, but due to the location (it was nicknamed the "Central House") and the fact that its floor lapidarium yielded, depending on the source, 7-9 sculptures, more than any other house (17% out of the total of 52 sculptures). When the location was flooded, the study envisioned that the "flood line" would cross right through this house, which would have allowed for further explorations, but the suggestion was ignored and the flood line was breached when the reservoir was formed. The most representative sculptures were discovered in this house, such as the Praroditeljka ("Foremother"), Danubius, Praotac ("Forefather"), Rodonačelnik ("Progenitor"), and Vodena vila ("Water fairy").

=== Interior ===
The interior of each house includes a fireplace (hearth) in the form of an elongated rectangle situated on the long axis of the floor plan. These fireplaces were built from massive rectangular stone blocks. The fireplaces are further extended with stone blocks to create a kind of small shrine in the back of the house. These shrines were always decorated with sculptures carved from massive round river stones and represent perhaps river gods or ancestors. Another significant feature of the houses is a shallow circular depression in the ground located precisely in middle of the floor. This may represent some type of altar.

The sculptures, fireplaces, altars, tables, arranged square stones, round depressions and intriguing triangles were all built ("concreted") into the hardened porphyritic floors. In all the houses they are in almost the same basic layout, which resembles the human figure. Scientists still disagree on the purpose of the artifacts, except that the fireplaces were indeed used for the fire. Still, the actual function is not clear. Archaeologist Milutin Garašanin described them as a "cult pit" or eventually a "ritual fireplace". In 1968, architect Peđa Ristić expressed doubt that this was a simple fireplace. He asserted that the rectangular shape of the fireplace is impractical, with a poor capability of conducting the smoke away. However, when he was working on the reconstruction of the houses, Ristić concluded that probably every house had a spit, which explains the elongated shape of the fireplace pit. Radivoje Pešić also was skeptical about the purpose of the fireplace. He focused rather on the triangles, which he claimed represented the ancient archetype of a writing system. This is not supported by recent science, and they are still being considered as symbols, not proto-letters. Pešić also concluded, since the symbols spread from the fireplace in a sequence that can't be deciphered, that it was actually a sacrificial altar and called the entire complex of artifacts a "fire altar".

Archaeologist Ljubinka Babović accepted Srejović's theory that the layout within the house represents the human figure, but she believed that the figure is actually an anthropomorphized representation of the Sun, with added hands. She asserted that every house was actually a small Sun shrine and that plan of the settlement represents the astronomical movement of the Sun. She referred to the round stones as "ash holes", because ash was discovered in the round depressions. Philologist Petar Milosavljević originally concluded that this ash hole, cornered by the rectangular stones, was the fireplace, following Pešić's idea, but later changed his opinion, accepting the general consensus that the rectangular depression in the center is the proper fireplace. Archaeologist Đorđe Janković wrote of the "unusual stone fireplaces for complex ritual purposes". Srejović also made the semantic distinction between the inner fireplace, ognjište, and the outer one, vatrište. Excavations on the locality Vlasac point to the gradual transformation from vatrište to ognjište, or bringing the fire inside the houses. Regardless of which of the depressions are the proper fireplace, it is evident that the human-like floor installation comprises several elements, which are connected by some, still undeciphered, functional relationships, as well as by visual and artistic ones.

==== Central installation ====
A pebble stone, placed in the geometrical center of the house and part of the floor installation representing the "head" of the perceived figure, is also variously explained. As it has a dent in it, it was suggested that it served as a primitive lamp, the so-called "Magdalene lamp", a rushlight with a wick made of moss. The dent was conceivably made so that grease or tallow could be placed in it. Ristić opposed the theory saying that no evidence of fat or burning have been discovered in any of the stones. He called the stones upretnik ("resistance stone") and believed their function was to serve as the foundation for the sticks or pillars, which held the covering construction of the house. During his reconstruction of the house, he used it for exactly that purpose. Another idea is that it was used as a pouring vessel (for honey, etc.) which was used during rituals. One proposed theory that it was used a grindstone was rejected as this was still in the pre-harvesting period. However, it may have been used for grinding wild seeds or aromatic herbs. The stones have curious engravings in the lower section. As the stones were "cemented" into the floor, the engravings couldn't be observed by the living from above ground, so it is suggested that they were meant for the dead, which were sometimes buried under the floor of the house. Babović described the floors as a "border between day and night".

The central piece of the central section, the "body", was a hearth which has been the subject of scientific controversy. It was definitely used for fire, as evidence of burning and ash is found. It was elongated, in the proportion of 1:3 or 1:4, and surrounded by stones. In the older periods, thin stones were used, later thicker ones and in the end, quite rough and irregular stones, even though the geometry remained refined. It is suggested that the size of the fireplace is actually used as an etalon, a measurement module for the proportions of the house. Ristić said that the length of the fireplace is equal to the length of the spit, calculating that this length is the radius of the circumscribed circle which is the base of the house. Based on the measurements in 51 houses, it was established that the average fire cavity is 78 cm (31 in) long and 24 cm (9.4 in) wide, which gives the ratio 1:3.25. Average width is another reason why some archaeologists believe that this wasn't a proper fireplace, it being too narrow and impractical. The depth of the hole varies from 15 to 25 cm (5.9 to 9.8 in), but at least one quarter of those have sloping bottoms. In these cases, the section closer to the entrance of the house is 10 to 15 cm (3.9 to 5.9 in) lower. The overall size of the fireplaces varies, depending on the size of the house, but it appears to be more balanced than the sizes of the houses. The smallest fireplace is 13 to 26 cm (5.1 to 10.2 in), while the largest are in House 54 (32 to 111 cm (13 to 44 in)) and House 37 31.5 to 105 cm (12.4 to 41.3 in).

Around the fireplace the larger stones were placed, sometimes in two levels. They are variously called "stone tables", "sacrificial plates", "market stalls" or "hands". The stones were already embedded when the red plaster was poured. In the later period of the Lepenski Vir I phase, there are a smaller number of stones around the hole, or they disappear altogether. In their place triangles appear which encircle the fireplace in an ellipsoid arrangement. They have been called simply triangles but also "triangular forms", "fireplace triangles" or "forks". Apart from Pešić's generally unsupported interpretation that they are a form of proto-writing, the triangles have been variously described as the "little houses for the dead", support for the spit's skewers, openings for the pouring of drinks and food for the dead buried under the floor, support for the construction of some larger stove-like object above the fireplace, symbols of light or fire, or simply vents for the heat from the fire. In all cases but one, the tips of the triangle are oriented towards the fireplace. The exception occurs in the locality of Kula. The prototype of the triangles appears to be the mandible of a female human, traversed with a small stone plate, which is pressed into the floor in House 40.

The "legs" of the installation extend almost to the outside of the house. The round depression, which also can't be definitively explained (fireplace, ash hollow, etc.) is in this section, and is equally accessible from both the inside and outside as it is situated at the entrance to the house. In the literature, it is also referred to as "(slanted) stone doorsteps" or simply "entrance". Babović noticed that there are several variants of it, which prompted her to classify the houses (or shrines, as she called them) into 4 categories. The categories are:

- "free step"; when slanted stones were placed like two spread legs;
- "tied step"; when slanted stones are placed in the same way as in "free step", but additional stones were placed on the open side to make the connection between the slanted stones, creating a shallow triangular or trapezoidal depression;
- "movement in the stationary status"; no slanted stones, but the entrance was paved with the stone slabs, forming an almost fortification-like obstacle at the entrance; there is no depression and the installation appears to be a sitting platform;
- "latent quiescence"; absence of any stone construction at the entrance; some researchers suggest that this is actually not a separate type but rather an indication that this part of the house may not have been covered, so that the elements eroded the stone over time. An additional influence may be that the outer hearth was right outside so the heating and cooling affected the stones.

In the Neolithic, or Starčevo phase of Lepenski Vir, the Lepenians began building dome-shaped furnaces in the houses. They were built on the floor and made from compacted earth, with the horseshoe-shaped foundations made of crushed stone. The calotte, or the dome of the furnace was made of baked earth. The hut which was built on the most elevated section of the settlement's terrain and was positioned almost in the center of it, had the largest furnace, 1.5 m × 1.4 m × 0.5 m (4 ft 11 in × 4 ft 7 in × 1 ft 8 in). Some researchers believe that due to its size and position, it was probably built for communal use, but they have also pointed out that its proportions equal those of the "prototype house", House 49. It also has been suggested that the furnace from Lepenski Vir was a prototype for building of other furnaces, due to the archetypical uniformity of bread ovens in the wider Balkan area, as well as the canonical repetition of the same shape from the Neolithic to the modern age.

=== Outer fireplace ===
The outer fireplace was almost a continuation of the internal central installation. Placed at the entrance, it also functioned as an obstacle ("fire serving as a door"). It probably served as protection against wild animals, but also for heating the house. The internal fireplace was too small for that purpose, and wood had to be cut and prepared for its small size. On the other hand, simply by bringing wood from the nearby abundant forests or utilizing large logs brought by the Danube into the bay, they would have been able to maintain large fires outside the houses. A ritualistic significance for the outer fire's location has also been proposed (keeping the shadows inside the house, ritualistic bypassing of the fire when entering the house, fire as the entrance into the world of the spirits, etc.). Srejović pointed out that location of the outer fireplace was actually quite logical, given the likely outlook of the inhabitants at that time. "The only building materials the Lepenians had was being used to replicate life in a cave...so their houses had a cave-like atmosphere". Cave dwellers also light fires at the entrances to the caves; otherwise they would be asphyxiated. The memory of cave dwelling was probably still vivid at the time, as there were contemporaneous humans in other parts of Europe still living in caves or natural shelters. The existence of a large outer fireplace along with and an apparently not very practical internal one, prompted Pavlović to conclude that the small hole in the house floor actually served to hold and maintain the fire or ember, which developed over time into a ritual. He compared it to the way the Pythian priestesses kept the fire at Delphi.

=== Reconstructions ===
The remains of the settlements in Lepenski Vir abide by the universal rules of architecture, so the architectural remains should be perceived and evaluated by those rules. However, the reconstruction of Lepenski Vir "resembles a gigantic, complex jigsaw puzzle, without an exemplar picture".

Science still has no definitive answer as to what the houses looked like above ground and numerous ideas have been proposed by architects, urbanists, historians and anthropologists. Vojislav Dević suggested a long, intertwined arch-like wattle ("fish skeleton") while Živojin Andrejić opted for transversal arches. Diagonally crisscrossed arches, with one wide at the entrance to prevent a bottleneck, were proposed by Pavlović. Srejović originally distanced himself from any of the proposed reconstructions, considering all of them flawed in some way. In his 1969 book he did print the reconstruction of Đorđe Mitrović, however his text differed greatly from the illustration. The concept was judged by some as clumsy, primitive, technically impossible and, simply, wrong. Even so, the drawings became internationally known. Srejović again distanced himself saying that such roof construction was too primitive for the perfectly shaped base, adding that we should allow for additional, still unknown elements which may have enabled a completely different construction. In 1973 he also rejected Ristić's reconstruction, claiming that none of the proposed solutions so far seemed definitive and that every idea had some incorrect details. He asserted that any final solution would not do justice to the imagination of the creators, and that it would take generations to resolve the problem. Later, in 1980, Ristić received his PhD from the University of Graz on the subject "Reconstructions of the prehistoric architecture in Lepenski Vir".

Borislav Jovanović, who explored the Padina location, attempted a reconstruction employing a basic "three-stick hut" arrangement. The "official", Mitrović's version, after many changes and adaptations became technically possible by the time of the opening of the visitor center in Lepenski Vir, in 2011. The main problem was the relation of the inclinations of the roof surface and the purlin. Marija Jovin and Siniša Temerinski, from the Institute for the protection of the monuments, created a model based on the pronounced inclination of the purlin, removal of the central pillar and a change in the direction of the roof carrier. In this way, the concept of a slender, elongated construction was achieved, which allowed efficient conduction of smoke to the outside. It was based on an older version of the simple tripod by Velizar Ivić and a more complex variant of Petar Đorđević, who worked on the excavation on the Padina location. Bojana Mihajlović and Andrej Starović from the National Museum in Belgrade created a holographic animation of the house based on the "shallow" purlin and with animal hides on the roof instead of pieces of wood. In complete contrast was the holographic version of the house by Borić. In the later period of explorations on the Vlasac locality, Borić constructed his version of a house on location, but it contains vertical walls which appeared much later in architecture. Some other proposed reconstructions were deemed even less possible as they included the orthogonal base or upper floor, based on the assumption that stony, garland-like reinforcements are actually remains of the former stone walls. Almost all proposed reconstructions, regardless of differences, belong to the pyramidal or tent-like type (even though they are shaped like frustums).

== Burials ==
Some of the dead were buried in the houses under the exceptionally preserved floors. They are believed to be prominent members of the group but there are also some skeletons of children.

Srejović believed that the Lepenians developed the "cult of the head", which is why all discovered sculptures are actually head busts. The ritual burials included a curious practice of removing the skull from the head, then the mandible from the skull before they were all buried separately. Skulls were placed in special stone structures. A skull would be placed on a larger stone slab then protected by crushed stones. All separately buried skulls are male, while all the mandibles are female.

Graves were built into the bases of the houses. Best preserved is the skeleton from House 69. Because of the excellent condition of the skeleton and its apparent height, archaeologist Aleksandar Bačkalov, who discovered it, thought it was quite "handsome" or "dashing" and named it Valentino, after the American actor, Rudolph Valentino. Bačkalov discovered it in a shallow dig which originates from the Proto-Vir, or Vir I-a period. Valentino died c. 8200 BC and architect Goran Mandić worked on his facial reconstruction. The position of the skeletons buried under the floors is such that above the genitals are the widening parts of the central installation, which prompted some researches to conclude that it actually symbolizes birth, regardless of the skeleton's sex, and that the posture of the skeleton, the so-called "Turkish style" represents the childbirth position. Burials with knees bent are a common feature in other sites originating out of Siberia, following the R Y-DNA haplogroup.

Ash also had some ritual significance, as ceramic vessels filled with ash were also discovered.

Valentino was used a model for the interactive 3D facial reconstruction, as part of the Serbian pavilion at the Expo 2020 in Dubai. The team headed by physical anthropologist Sofija Stefanović who reconstructed the face of the 10,000-year-old human, with help from experts in osteology, DNA and forensics, using the metaverse technology, used in gaming. Stefanović heads the project called "Digital ancient people". They estimated that Valentino was 55 years old, 178 centimetres (70 in) tall, and weighing 70 kilograms (150 lb). The entire Serbian pavilion was designed after the presumed slanted roofs of the Lepenski Vir houses, and decorated with their sculptures replicas.

== Sculptures ==
Praroditeljka "Foremother"
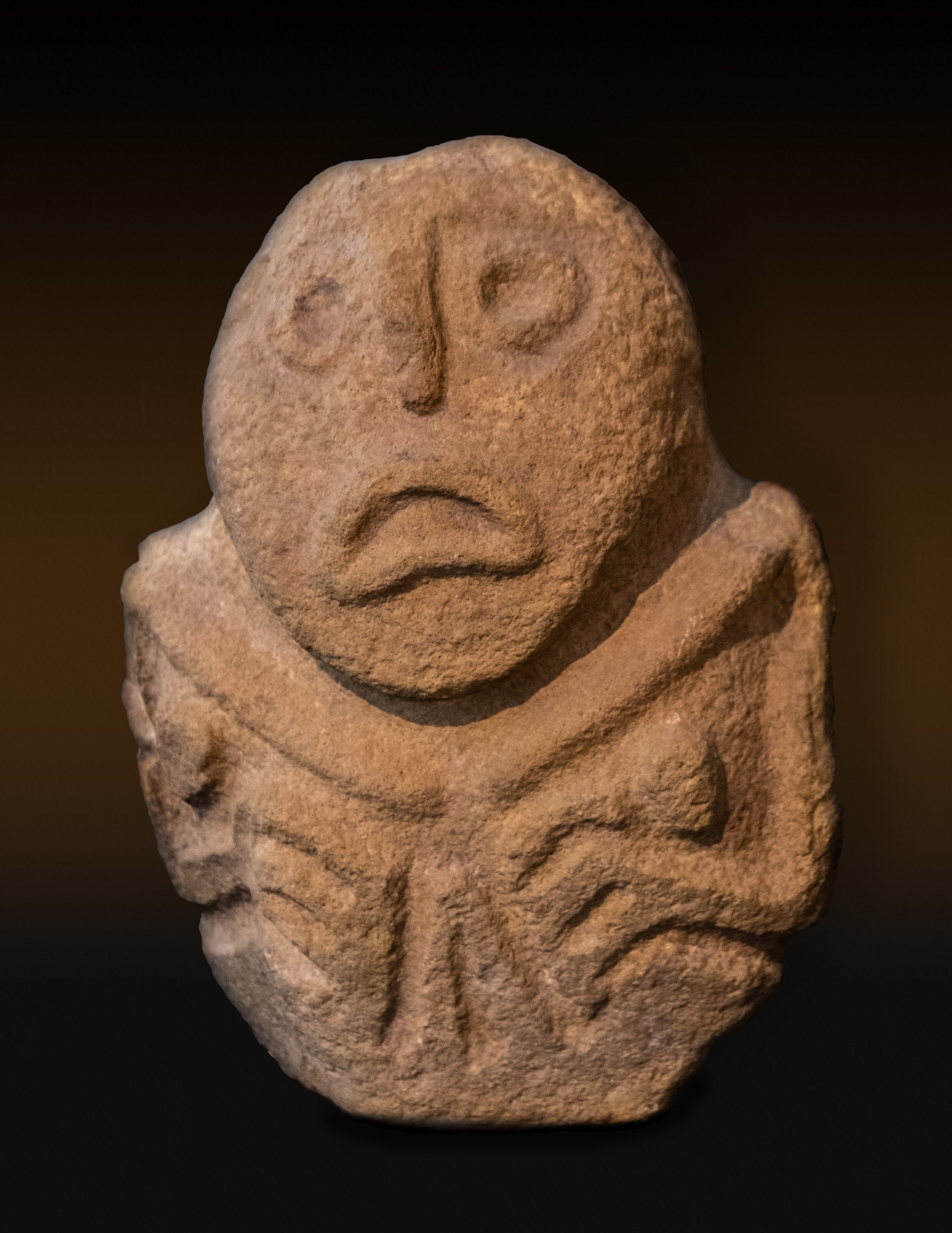
- Artist: Lepenski Vir culture
- Year: ~7000 BC
- Type: Cobblestone (red sandstone)
- Dimensions: 51 cm × 39 cm (20 in × 15 in)
- Location: Belgrade

The Lepenski Vir sculptures consist of numerous prehistoric figurines dating from 7000 BC found intact at Lepenski Vir. The earliest sculptures found on the site date to the time of the Lepenski Vir I-b settlement. They are present in all the subsequent layers until the end of the distinct Lepenski Vir culture. All the sculptures were carved from round sandstone cobbles found on the river banks.

The sculptures can be classified into two distinct categories: one with simple geometric patterns and the other representing humanoid figures. The latter is the more interesting. All of the sculptures were modeled in a strongly expressionistic manner. Only the head and face of the human figures were modeled realistically, with strong brow arches, an elongated nose, and a wide, fish-like mouth. Hair, beard, arms, and hands can be seen on some of the figures in a stylized form. Many fish-like features are evident. Along with the position these sculptures had in the house shrine, they suggest a connection with river gods.

The sculptures were components of the house itself, as they were built into the stone flooring. They are the oldest group ("portrait") of sculptures discovered so far. Though the sculptures are no more than 60 cm (24 in) in length, they are considered historically "monumental", as no older sculptures of this size have so far been discovered. Other sculptures from the same period, such as in Asia Minor and Palestine, are smaller. Also, unlike other sculptures from that period which have carved noses and eyes, the ones in Lepenski Vir have mouths and ears.

Art historian and professor at the University of Belgrade Lazar Trifunović said that the sculptures look like "they were made by Henry Moore".

Some of the sculptures became popular following media attention in the 1980s. In their book "The Art of Lepenski Vir" from 1983, Srejović and Babović individually described some of them. Probably the best known is the Praroditeljka, or "Foremother", pictured above right. 51 cm × 39 cm (20 in × 15 in), the image is often exploited in the media and became a symbol of Lepenski Vir. Srejović and Babović considered it "impressive", a possible embodiment of the female principle of the fishlike beings. She is thought to be equal to the opposite, male version, "Danubius". Female elements and attributes appear canonical, symmetrical, rigid and though shaped like a figure, eventually quite reduced. She has two vents on her shoulders. Traces of the original red coating pigment are still visible. Another sculpture is likewise essential, as it is the first known portrait-type sculpture larger than a human head in human history. Named Rodonačelnik, or "Progenitor", it represents a head and measures 52 cm × 33 cm (20 in × 13 in). Considered a type of totem, it appears more human- than fish-like. It has been described as "mysterious and lonely". The red pigment remnants on the eye bags and on the neck.

== Controversies ==
Though Obrad Kujović discovered the locality first, it is Dragoslav Srejović who is today recognized as the man who discovered Lepenski Vir. In his publication "Lepenski Vir" from 1969, he mentions "a group of experts" who noticed the locality before him "at the end of the summer of 1960", but never gave their names, while he mentioned many other people who helped with the excavations. In 1979, the daily Večernje Novosti published an interview with Kujović who repeated the story of how he had discovered the location. He added that "for the scientific exploration and interpretation of the discovered materials" the glory rightfully belongs to Srejović, but objected that Srejović never mentioned the people who discovered it. Srejović replied that he accepts the Kujović's claim and that it is important to recognize the exact date of discovery for such an important site. He added that he omitted their names as they were hired and paid (by the Institute of Archaeology) to survey the terrain. However, in 1996 a 30th anniversary of the discovery of Lepenski Vir was organized. Kujović publicly asked Srejović if he already acknowledged that the discovery happened in 1960, why he didn't organize the 35th anniversary. Srejović died later that year.

=== Conspiracy theories ===
As the concept of an "architecturally modern" settlement and its culture seemed so disconnected from accepted knowledge on the subject at the time, fringe theories on the civilization of Lepenski Vir developed. Ufologists believed that the Lepenians were actually aliens from outer space. Such conspiracy theories also existed in Russia, while one of the proponents of the ancient astronauts theory, Erich von Däniken, showed interest in the locality.

== Archaeoastronomy ==
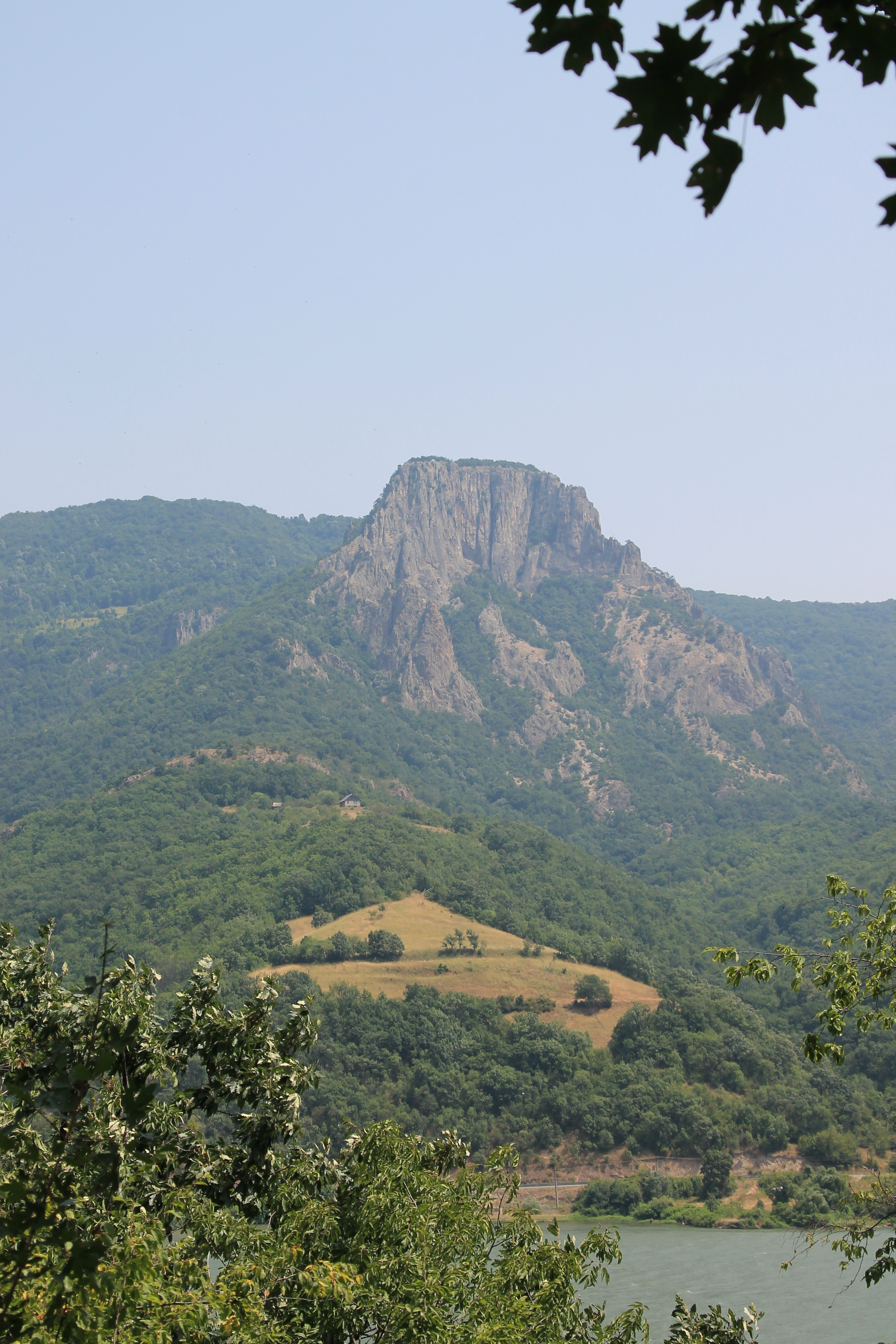
Trescovăț cliff

The first archaeoastronomical surveys were conducted during the winter solstice in 2014. They pointed to the possibility of a "double sunrise" occurring during the summer solstice. The volcanic hill Trescovăț, which is located across the Danube from Lepenski Vir, has a rocky outcropping near the top and an inclination higher than the inclination of the Sun's apparent orbit. The Sun appears above Trescovăț, then goes behind the outcropping and reappears again. The phenomenon was observed and confirmed during the summer solstice of 2015. The entire passage, which was filmed, lasts slightly over 4 minutes. Scientific literature mentions two archaeological locations in Great Britain where a "double sunset" has been observed during the solstices, but a "double sunrise" has not been recorded. As the axial tilt has changed since then, a geospatial analysis was conducted using the GPS, which proved that the "double sunrise" occurred at that time as well, and that it was visible from the original location of Lepenski Vir.

The phenomenon was investigated by Pavlović and Aleksandra Bajić, who published their findings in 2016 book "The Sun of Lepenski Vir". As only the specific position of the Sun during the winter and summer solstices was necessary to calculate the time using a reference point which repeats after one year, they believe that Lepenians used the "double sunrise" as a basis for some kind of a solar calendar which dated to 6300–6200 BC. As Lepenski Vir was a sedentary community for several millennia, Pavlović and Bajić hold that the inhabitants must have observed the phenomenon, especially since people were then much more observant of natural phenomena than they are today. Even Srejović, who died in 1996 and was unaware of the phenomenon, said that, based on the geographical configuration of the gorge, the "dance of light and shadows occasionally reach the levels of hierophany". The terrain was further surveyed by theodolite, and an astrogeodetic analysis was conducted in 2017. The results show that the "double sunrise" was visible from the northernmost part of the settlement. Viewed from the southernmost part, the summer solstice Sun rose on the southern part of the flattened top of Trescovăț. So, the whole settlement was accurately measured with respect to the astronomical event.

== Relocation ==
The Iron Gate I Hydroelectric Power Station became operational between 1970 and 1972, when the artificial Đerdap Lake was formed. The lake was to flood the original site so it was almost entirely removed to another location which was first confirmed to be "archaeologically sterile". The new location is approximately 100 m (330 ft) downstream and 30 m (98 ft) higher than the previous one, and is less approachable from the river, due to the scree accumulation on the bank and excess dirt from the preparation of the new site. The greater part of the discovered settlement, which consists of almost all houses from the Vir I period, was relocated in 1971. As the Danube now passes above the natural rocky "anchors" which previously caused it to whirl, it took only 10 years for the river to dislodge and wash away portions of the old bank and to undermine the old location, already weakened by the archaeological excavations.

The old location of Lepenski Vir itself is 12 m (39 ft) below the present level of the lake, while the localities of Vlasac and Padina are 15 m (49 ft) and 6.5 m (21 ft) below, respectively. Archaeologists (Srejović, Branislav Ćirić, Milka Čanak Medić, etc.) prepared a study entitled "The Relocation Project" on preserving and protecting the bank, especially preventing landslides, but the study was largely ignored.

The vicinity of Lepenski Vir was never fully excavated. Srejović himself said that there is "more of Lepenski Vir, both up and down", meaning below the Proto-Vir, and further into the hinterland. The Proto-Vir layer is completely flooded, while some of the Vir I excavations weren't relocated, e.g., the houses which occupied the most elevated section of the plateau (houses 61, 65, 66, 67), though they were also flooded. In general, the material remains of the cultures in the Iron Gate Gorge were almost all flooded and forever lost to further scientific research.

== Assessment ==
The findings of the Lepenski Vir study, published for the first time on 16 August 1967 at a press conference organized by Lazar Trifunović, radically reenvisioned the history of Europe. It was noted that the printing of some history textbooks was delayed so that they could be revised. Opposing voices, however, claimed that Lepenski Vir can't be dated to the Mesolithic, as Europe was barely inhabited at the time and the population lived in caves and other natural shelters.

The research issues that Lepenski Vir presents are typical of similar archaeological sites from prehistoric periods: without written evidence and because of the absence of wider context, excessively broad conclusions tend to be extrapolated from a quite narrow base of information. Incomplete data diverts the exploration and analysis of Lepenski Vir into diffuse directions. Classicist Milan Budimir described the findings as "bold hypotheses which shed a dubious light on the (historical) dark".

Yet, Lepenski Vir is the oldest planned settlement in Europe and has unique, trapezoidal-shaped houses seen nowhere else. Its culture has yielded not only the earliest discovered portrait sculptures, but also the first sculptures larger than life-size in the history of human art. The sculptures are the largest up to that period and among the first to have a carved mouth or ears. Additionally, the skeletal remains from Lepenski Vir comprise almost half of one of the largest Mesolithic anthropological series, and are important for the future bio-archaeological and DNA research.

By 26 May 1966, the State Institute for the protection of the cultural monuments had already protected Lepenski Vir as a cultural monument (Decision 554/1), expanding the level of protection on 3 February 1971 (Decision 01-10/21). In 1979 Lepenski Vir was declared a Cultural Monument of Exceptional Importance (State Gazette, No. 14/79). Despite its immense importance, However, Lepenski Vir has not yet been nominated for the UNESCO Intangible Cultural Heritage List. This was partially due to the bureaucracy of the state and certain technicalities, and partially because the Museum of Lepenski Vir had to be finished first. Another problem may be the fact that the original location of the site has been flooded, and the site elevated to higher ground. Houses 61 and 65 were not moved and at the low water level, they are only 59 cm (23 in) below the surface, so technically, they could be nominated for the UNESCO listing.

Architect Branislav Krstić (1922–2016), a former commissioner of UNESCO, suggested in 2010 that Lepenski Vir should be nominated together with the entire Iron Gates Gorge, as an "integral cultural and natural monument". As Krstić stated, apart from the ancient cultures, the wider area of Lepenski Vir was later part of the Roman, and later Byzantine, Danubian Limes, contains Roman and mediaeval fortresses, like Golubac Fortress and Fetislam, while the massive Iron Gates Dam is a monument to industrialization and electrification in the 20th century. Ristić opposed this course of action, saying that the original, "crystal clear" artifacts (sculptures) should be separated from the architectural remains which were ruined, partially because of the submergence and partially because of "catastrophic archaeological mismanagement during the 1960s excavations". He asserted that the architectural remains were fragile to begin with, and that during the excavations it was only partially presented but totally destroyed during the relocation. Architect and artist Aleksandar Deroko called it the "largest cultural massacre of the 20th century" and said that "world-renowned scientists will no longer be able to explore the site". The elevated and reconstructed section in the museum was to be relocated by a project, led by Milorad Medić, which envisioned the relocation of entire house floors in steel frames. During the relocation, however, the fragile floors crumbled into pieces and dust, so they were moved in parts and then reassembled in the museum. Ristić believes that the focus should be on the sculptures, which are fully preserved: "Just as the cave paintings (in Lascaux) revealed the soul of the Paleolithic man from 20,000-30,000 years ago, so the pebble sculpting (in Lepenski Vir) reveal the soul of the Mesolithic man from 7,000-9,000 years ago". He denounced the museum as being an "incomplete forgery...that possesses neither soul nor science, and has no purpose". He concluded that Lepenski Vir, due to its importance, deserves a fitting monument, a counterpart to the monumental cliff sculpture of the face of Decebalus, leader of the Dacians from the 1st century. He proposed that Serbian counterpart should be a gigantic face from the Lepenian sculptures, which would appear to arise out of the Danube, and that Lepena Rock, halfway between Lepenski Vir and Vlasac, would be a suitable site for the monument.

== Gallery ==
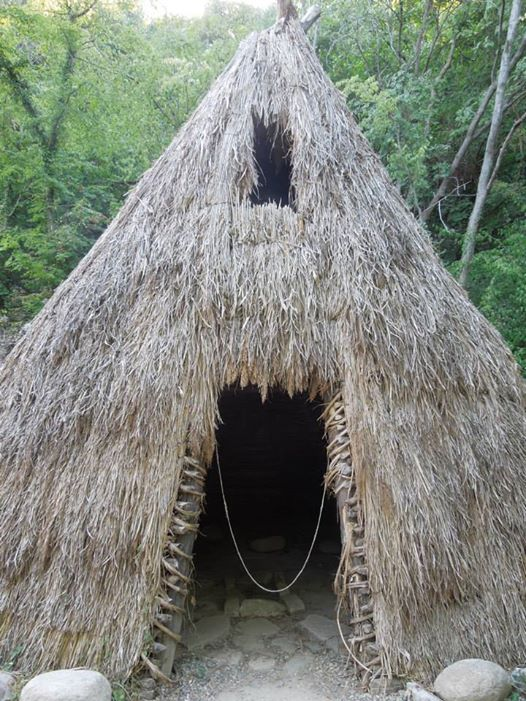
Replica of a house

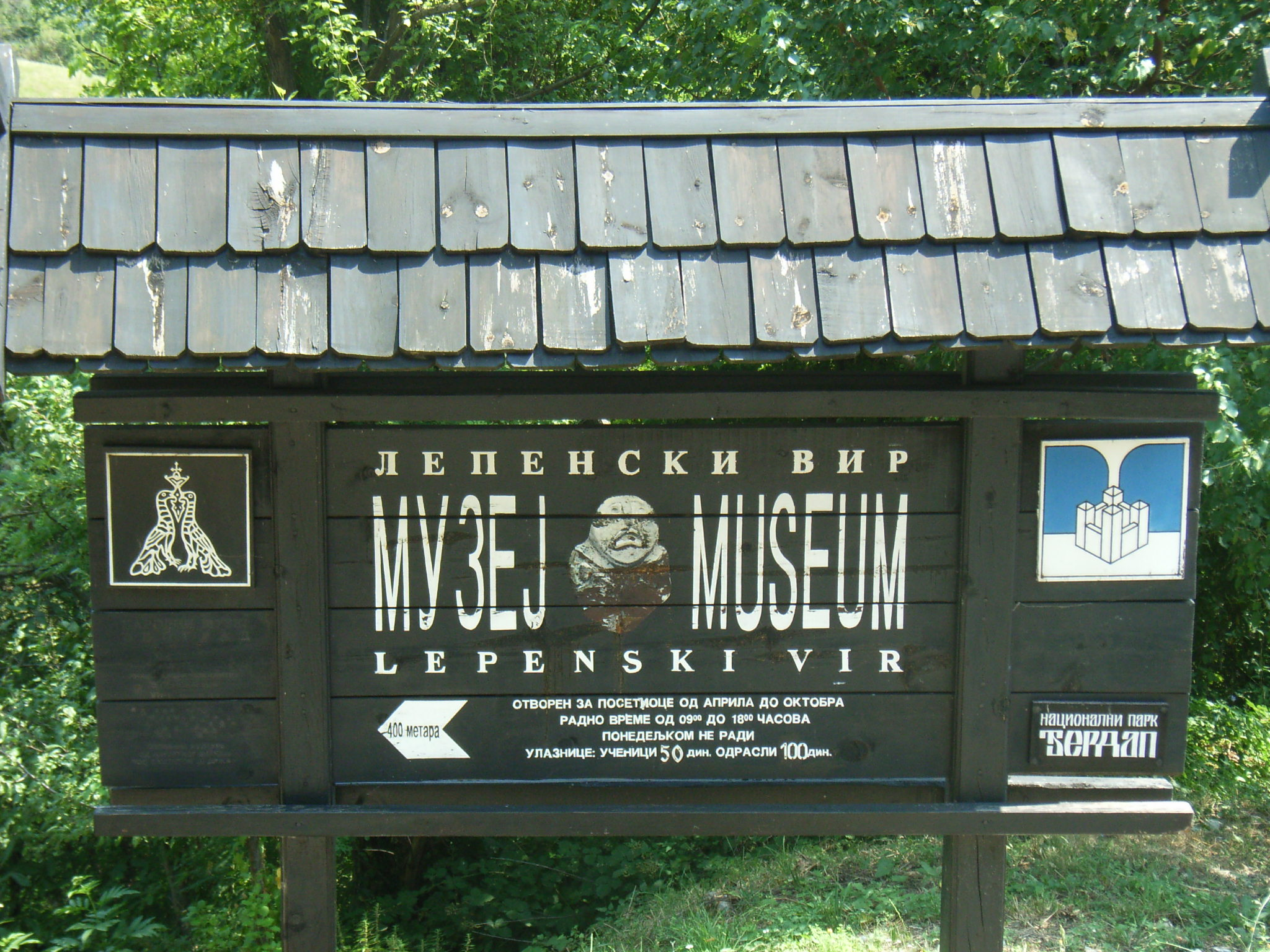
Entrance into the museum

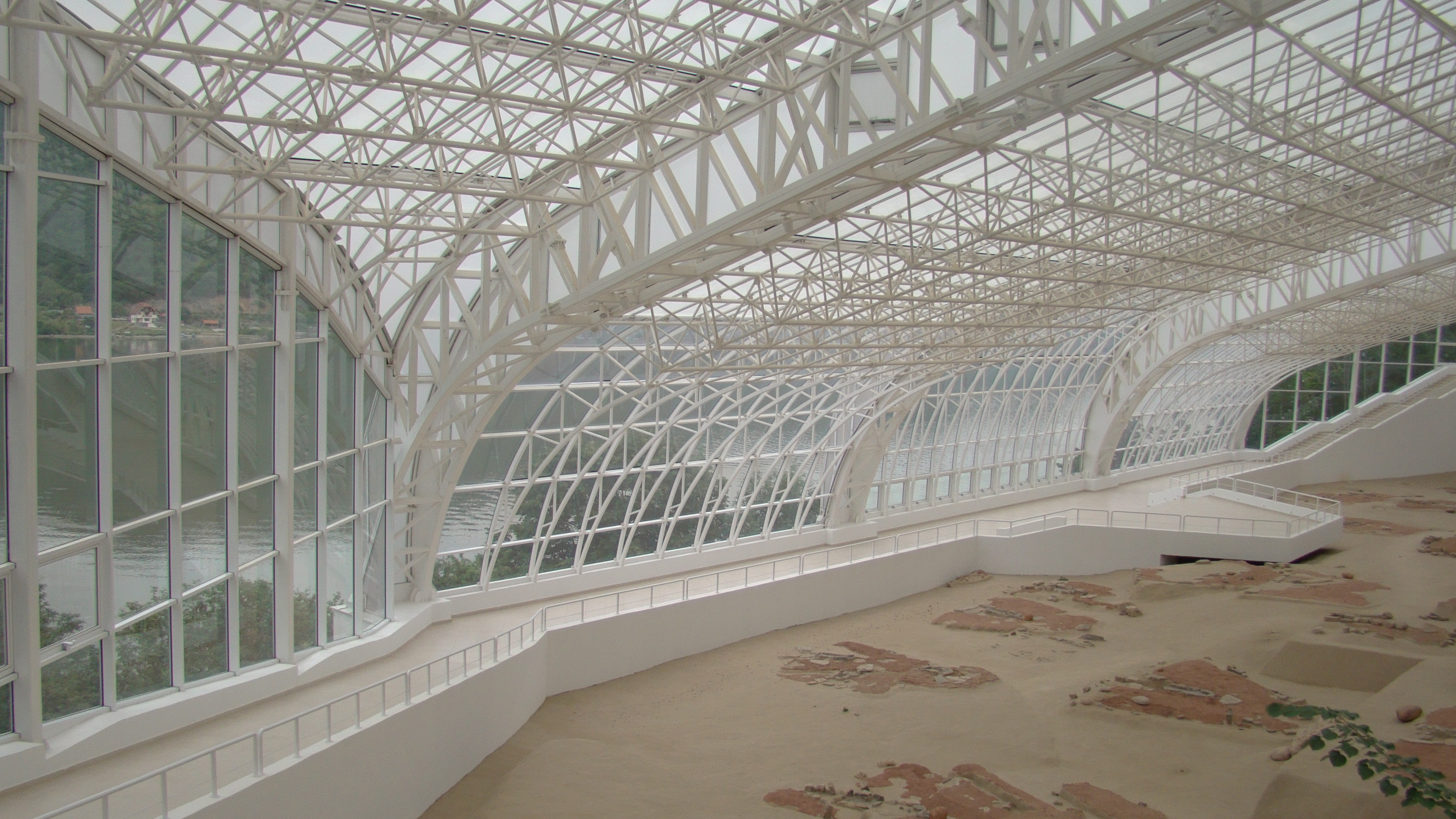
Glass protection

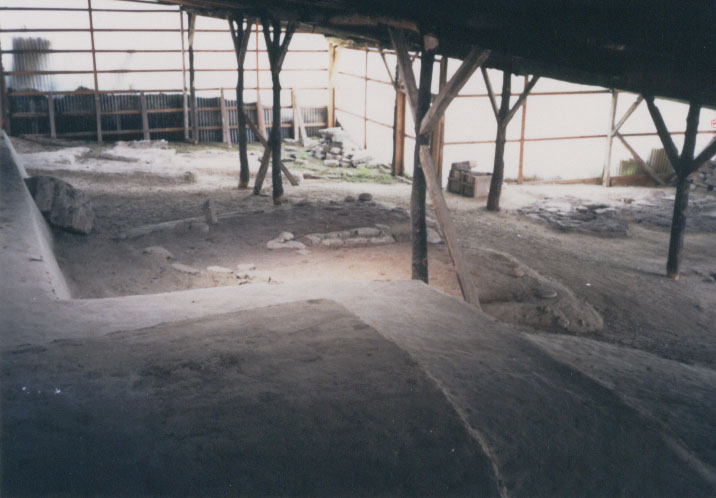
Main museum section

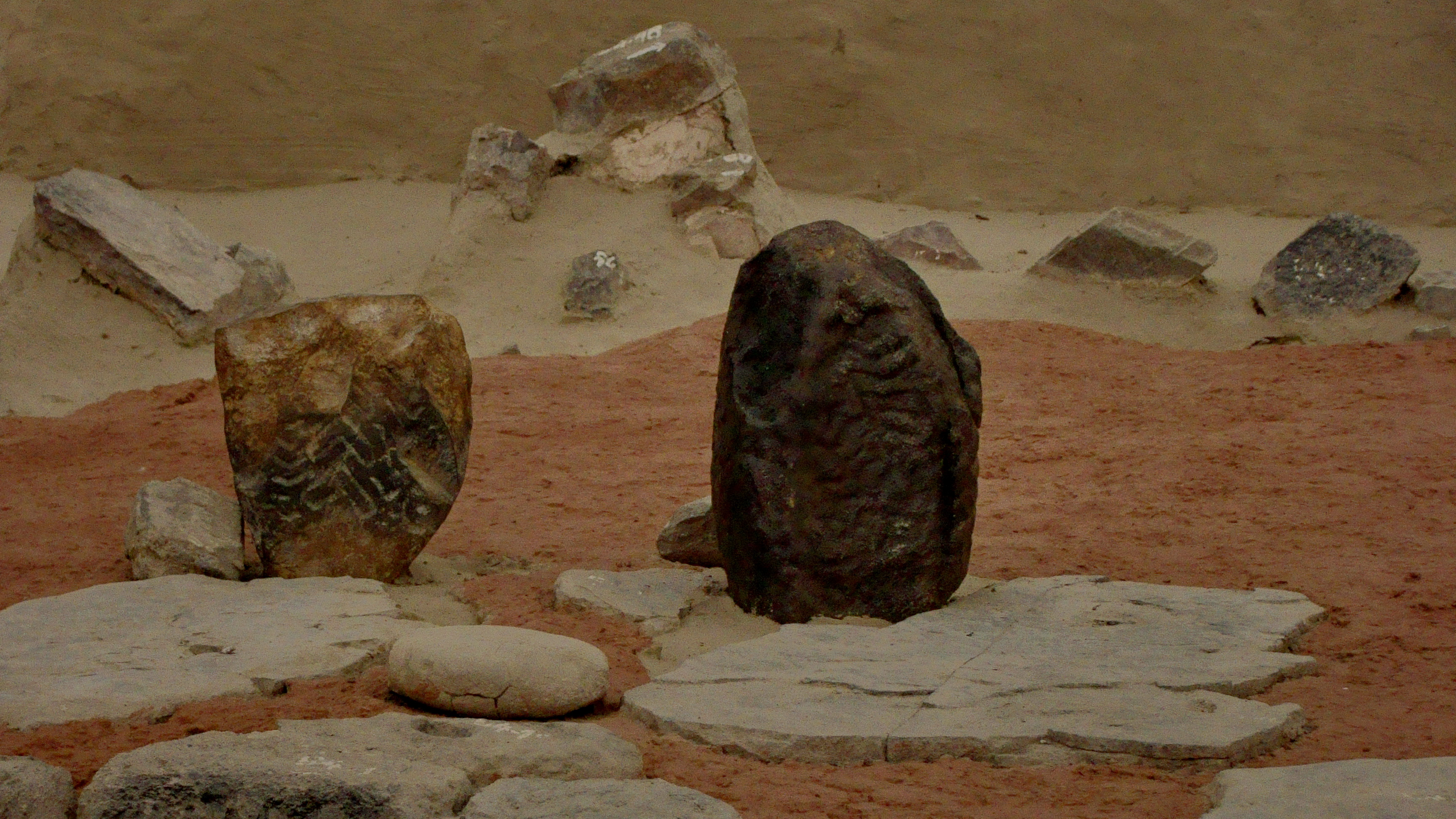
Sculptures

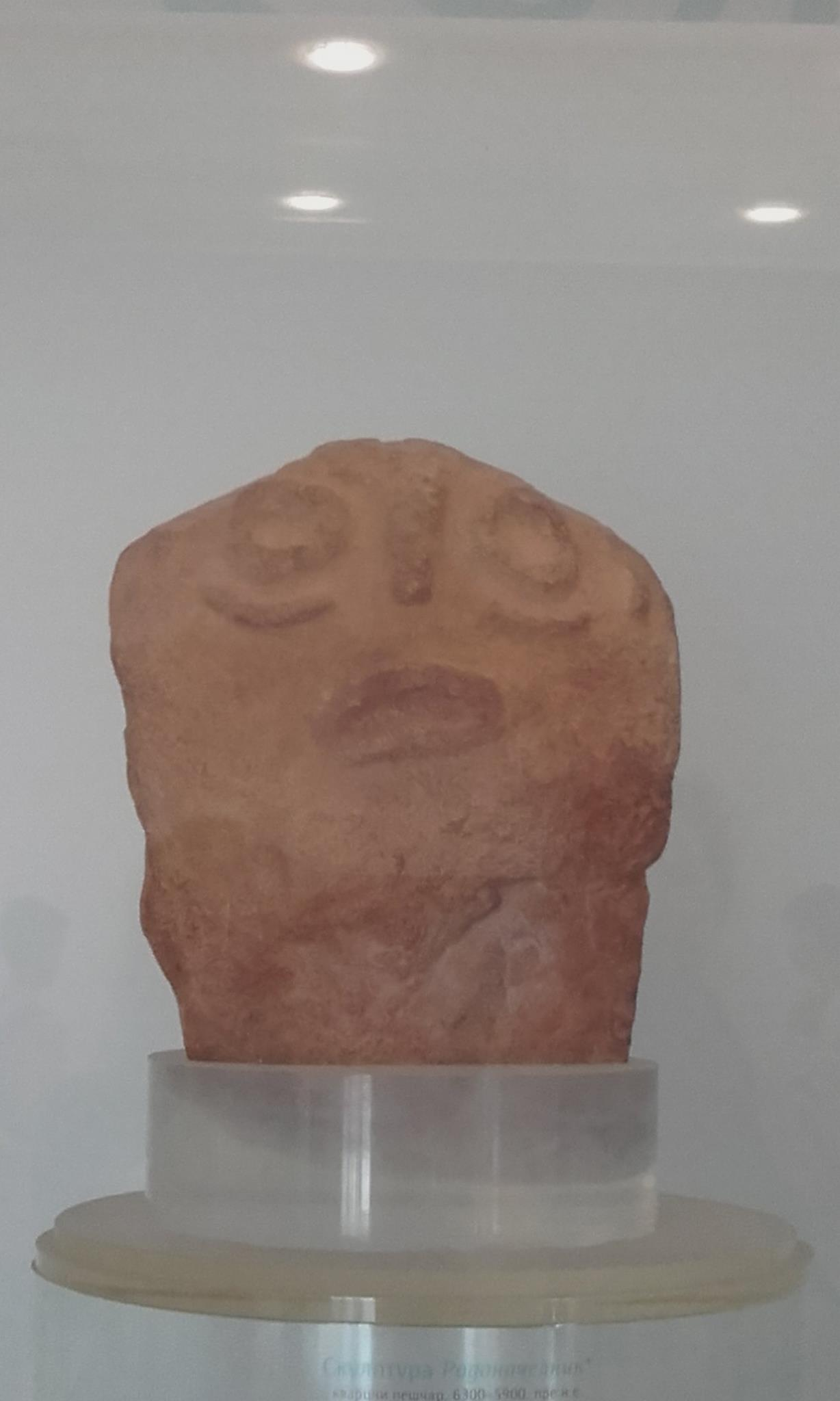
Lepenski Vir sculpture 1

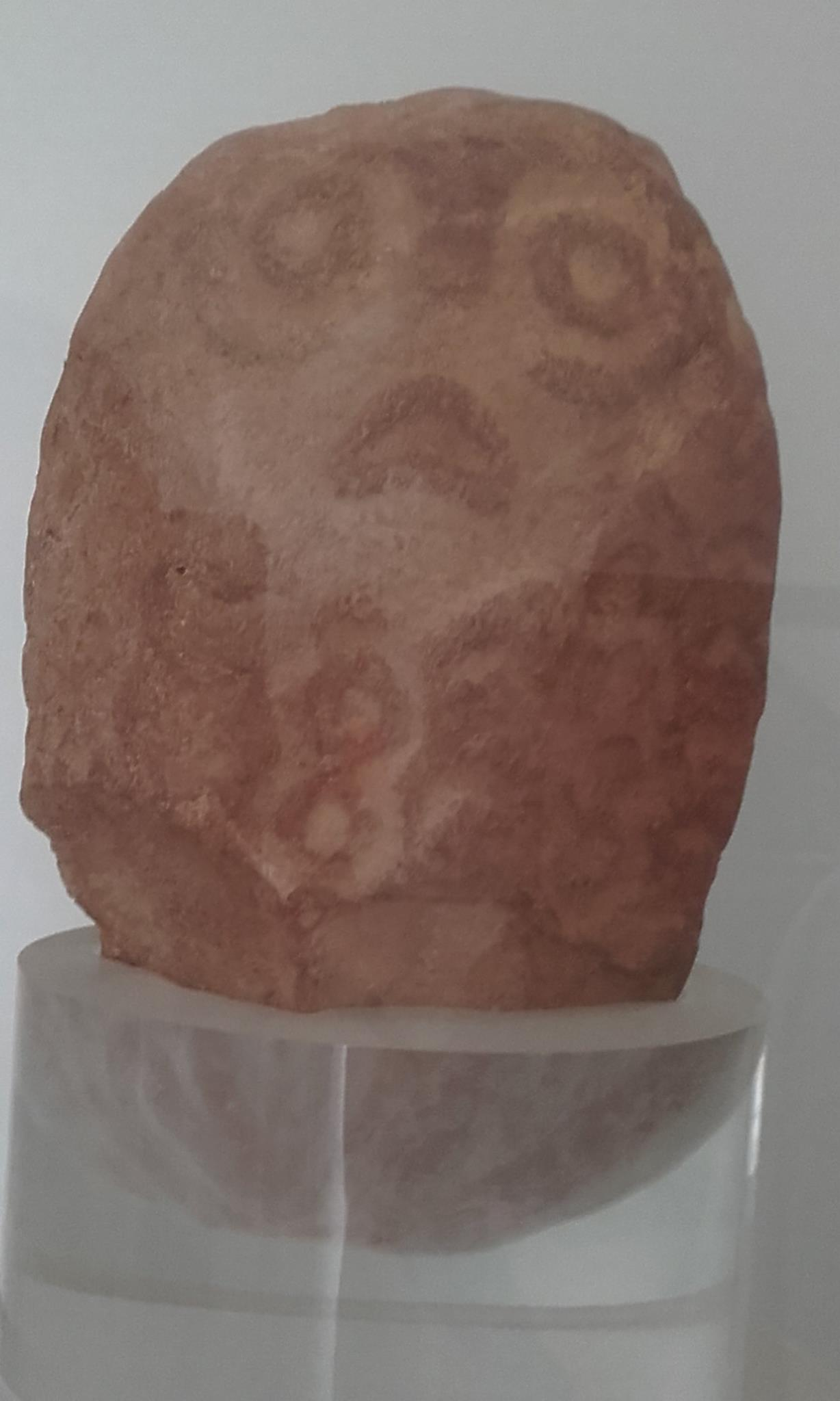
Lepenski Vir sculpture 2

== See also ==
- Monument of Culture of Exceptional Importance
- Prehistoric Europe
- Tourism in Serbia

== Sources ==
- Brami, Maxime (11 October 2022). "Was the Fishing Village of Lepenski Vir Built by Europe's First Farmers?". Journal of World Prehistory. 35 (2). Springer Science+Business Media: 109–133. doi:10.1007/s10963-022-09169-9.
- Hofmanová, Zuzana (2017). Palaeogenomic and Biostatistical Analysis of Ancient DNA Data from Mesolithic and Neolithic Skeletal Remains (PDF) (PhD). Johannes Gutenberg University Mainz.
- Marchi, Nina (12 May 2022). "The genomic origins of the world's first farmers". Cell. 185 (11). Cell Press: 1842–1859. doi:10.1016/j.cell.2022.04.008. hdl:1887/3505666. PMC 9166250. PMID 35561686.
- Mathieson, Iain (21 February 2018). "The Genomic History of Southeastern Europe". Nature. 555 (7695). Nature Research: 197–203. Bibcode:2018Natur.555..197M. doi:10.1038/nature25778. PMC 6091220. PMID 29466330.
- Dragoslav Srejovic Europe's First Monumental Sculpture: New Discoveries at Lepenski Vir. (1972) ISBN 0-500-39009-6
- Excavations reveal ancient civilization with a sense of style Ekathimerini.com November 16, 2007
